= Mystic Mountain =

Cosmic nebula

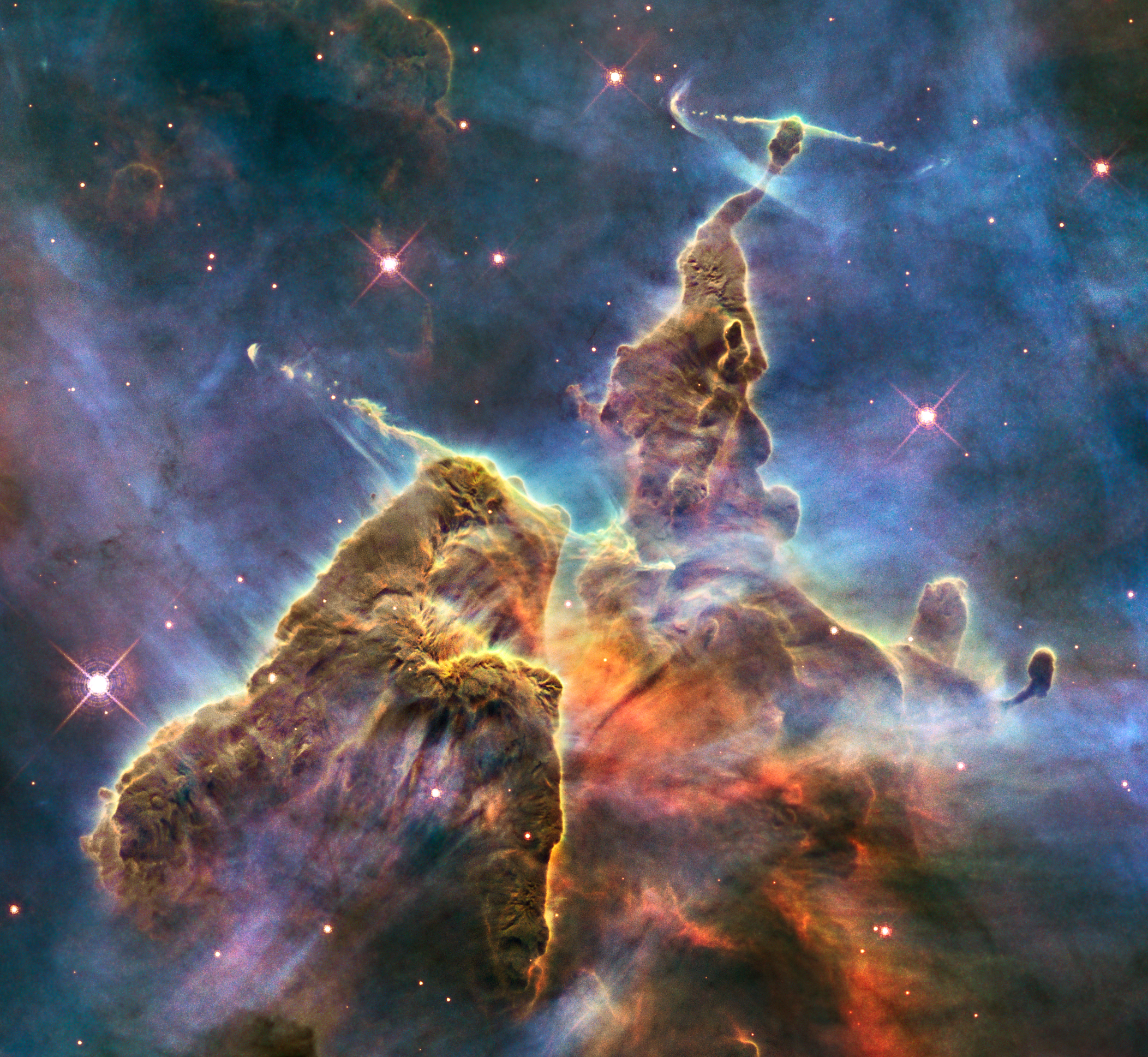
Mystic Mountain

The location of the feature can be seen in this wider view of the Carina Nebula.

Mystic Mountain is a photograph and a term for a region in the Carina Nebula imaged by the Hubble Space Telescope. The view was captured by the then-new Wide Field Camera 3, though the region was also viewed by the previous generation instrument. The new view celebrated the telescope's 20th anniversary of being in space in 2010. Mystic Mountain contains multiple Herbig–Haro objects where nascent stars are firing off jets of gas which interact with surrounding clouds of gas and dust. This region is about 7,500 light-years (2,300 parsecs) away from Earth. The pillar measures around three light-years in height (190,000 astronomical units). The name was influenced by the works of H. P. Lovecraft.

== See also ==
- Pillars of Creation, another noted Hubble image
- List of deep fields
- HD 93129
- Trumpler 14
- List of Hubble anniversary images
