= IX Carinae =

Star in the constellation Carina

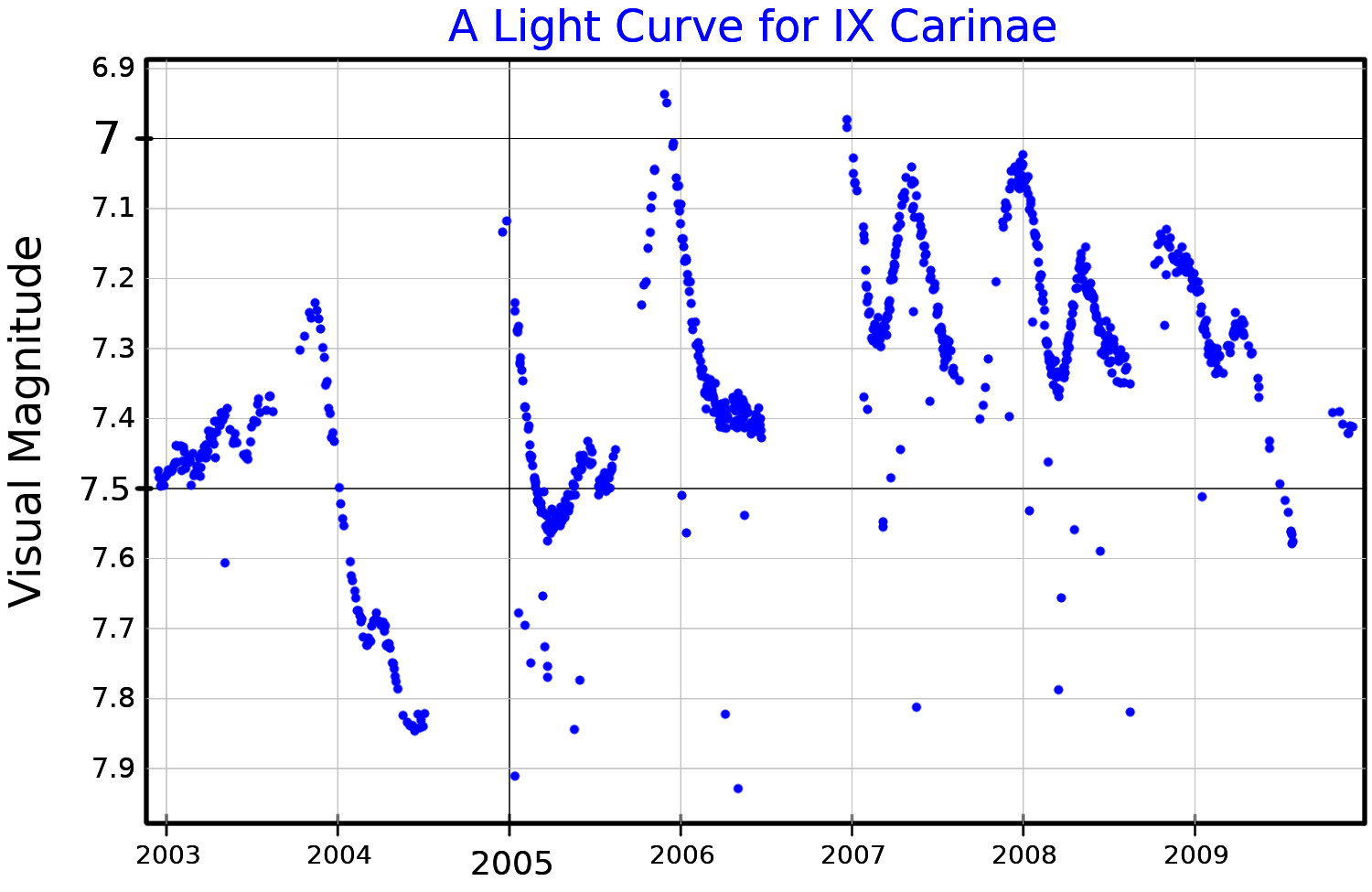
- A visual band light curve for IX Carinae, plotted from ASAS data

Observation data Epoch J2000 Equinox J2000
- Constellation: Carina
- Right ascension: 10^{h} 50^{m} 26.300^{s}
- Declination: −59° 58′ 56.57″
- Apparent magnitude (V): 7.2 - 8.5 or 6.87 - 7.9

Characteristics
- Evolutionary stage: red supergiant
- Spectral type: M2Iab
- Variable type: SRc

Astrometry
Radial velocity (R_{v})	0.90±1.8 km/s
Proper motion (μ)	RA: −6.466 mas/yr Dec.: +2.322 mas/yr
Parallax (π)	0.4436±0.0220 mas
Distance	7,400 ± 400 ly (2,300 ± 100 pc)

Details
Mass	13 M_{☉}
Radius	603 R_{☉}
Luminosity	61,660 L_{☉}
Temperature	3,660±170 K

Other designations
- IX Car, CD−59°3368, CPD−59°2775, GSC 08626-01670, HD 94096, HIP 52991, IRAS 10484−5943, 2MASS J10502630−5958563, PPM 339497, SAO 238523, TYC 8626-1670-1

Database references
SIMBAD	data

IX Carinae (IX Car) is a red supergiant and pulsating variable star of spectral type M2Iab in the constellation Carina. It is a member of the Carina OB1 association along the Carina Nebula.

In 1948, Daniel Joseph Kelly O'Connell announced that the star is a variable star. IX Carinae is a semiregular variable star, but its properties are poorly defined. Different sources give its brightness range as magnitude 7.2 to 8.5. or 6.87 to 7.9. The International Variable Star Index finds a period of approximately 384 days from ASAS-3 and visual observations, but also gives a possible period of 108 days. Another analysis finds a primary period of 408±50 d and a longer secondary period of 4,400±2,000 d.

The physical characteristics of IX Carinae are also only known approximately, partly because of an uncertain distance. The effective temperature is around 3,600 K, while its bolometric luminosity is between 34,000 L_{☉} and 134,000 L_{☉}. It is one of the largest stars with a radius of approximately 600 R_{☉} (420,000,000 km; 2.8 au). If placed at the center of the Solar System, it would extend close to the orbit of the outer asteroid belt.

IX Carinae has been listed as a candidate supernova close enough to Earth that pre-collapse neutrinos could be detected, allowing for observations of the star to be made from before the supernova explosion.
