= NGC 1592 =

Irregular galaxy in the constellation Eridanus

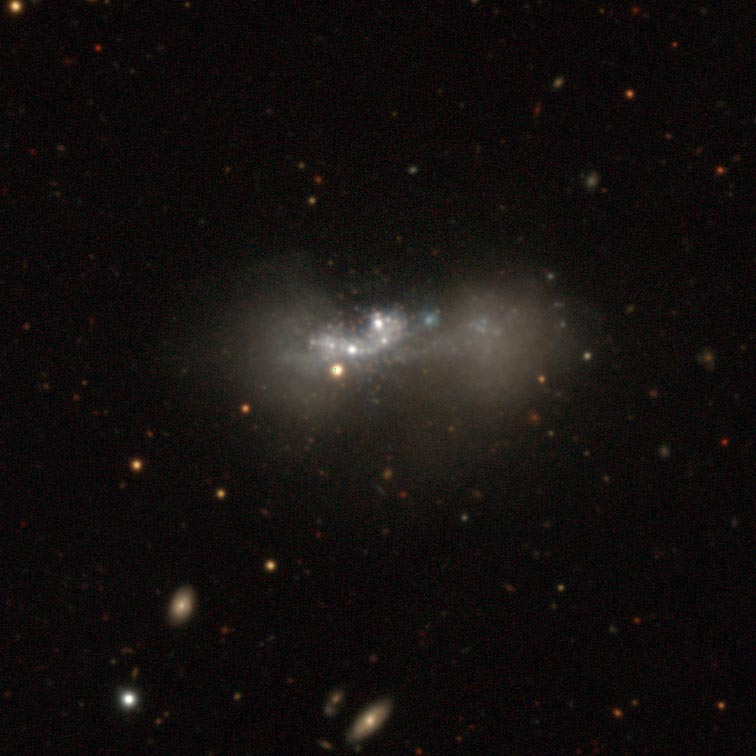
- NGC 1592 with legacy surveys

Observation data (J2000.0 epoch)
- Constellation: Eridanus
- Right ascension: 04^{h} 29^{m} 40.1^{s}
- Declination: −27° 24′ 31″
- Redshift: 0.003149
- Heliocentric radial velocity: 944 km/s
- Distance: 45 mly (redshift); 30 (TF relation)
- Apparent magnitude (V): 15.5

Characteristics
- Type: Irr
- Apparent size (V): 1.6 x 0.55

Other designations
- ESO 421-IG 002 ESO 042739-2731.0 VV 647 AM 0427-273 MCG -05-11-011 LCSB L0237O IRAS F04276-2731 SGC 042739-2731.0 GSC 6467 01772 HIPASS J0429-27 PGC 015292 11HUGS 079

NGC 1592 is an irregular galaxy in the constellation Eridanus. It is about 20,000 light-years across. It has not been studied in detail, as it is at 27 degrees south, making it not visible below 63 degrees north in a flat area, and about 50 degrees north in a hilly area. It was discovered in 1835 by John Herschel.

== 2014 observations ==
Until 2014, not much was known about the galaxy, other than the fact it was irregular. In early 2014, the galaxy was observed with a 2-foot telescope at the SARA remote observatory in Chile, revealing the galaxy in higher resolution. It appears the galaxy is in the process of forming stars at a high rate - primarily in the red areas in the image. Additionally, the galaxy has several small clumps of stars, implying an ongoing merger.

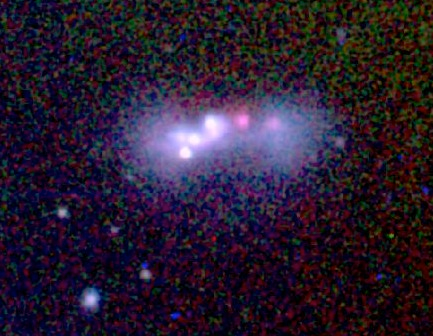
SARA observation of NGC 1592 in Hα (red) and visual (blue)

== Companions ==
NGC 1592 appears to have a companion, 2MFGC (2MASS Flat Galaxy Catalog) 3572, at 40 million light years away, assuming similar velocity with NGC 1592. they are separated by about 750,000 ±200,000 light years.
