= Great Nebula =

Great Nebula or great nebula may refer to:

- Orion Nebula
- Carina Nebula
