= NGC 1777 =

Globular Cluster in the constellation Mensa

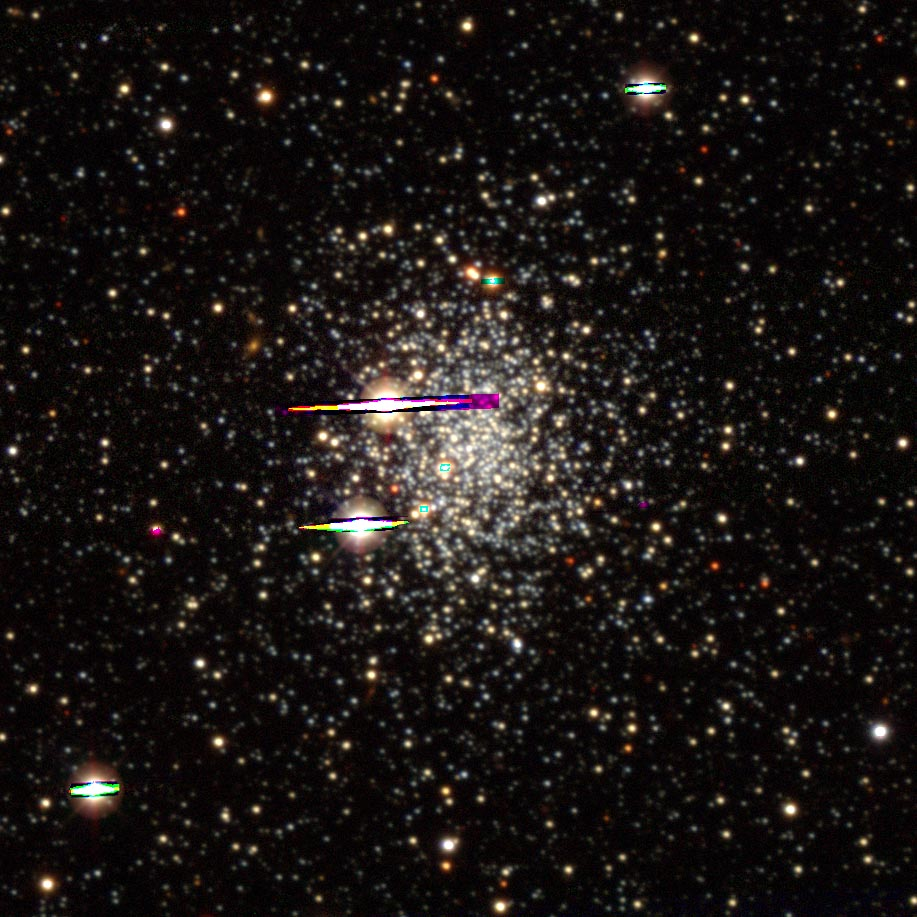
- NGC 1777 imaged by DESI Legacy Survey

Observation data (J2000 epoch)
- Constellation: Mensa
- Right ascension: 12^{h} 42^{m} 25.3^{s}
- Declination: −74° 17′ 07″
- Distance: 166,300 ly (51 kpc)
- Apparent magnitude (V): 12.80

Physical characteristics
- Metallicity: [Fe/H] = −0.60 ± 0.10 dex
- Estimated age: 1.15 ± 0.15 Gyr
- Other designations: NGC 1777, ESO 33-1

NGC 1777 is an intermediate-age open cluster located in the Large Magellanic Cloud (LMC) within the southern constellation of Mensa. Although sometimes discussed in the context of globular cluster due to its dense, populous structure and appearance, it is typically classified as an open cluster given its age and characteristics. It is one of 15 populous LMC clusters studied extensively using HST/WFPC2 color-magnitude diagrams, with ages ranging from approximately 0.3 to 3 billion years.

The object was discovered on November 11, 1836 by astronomer John Herschel.

== Characteristics ==
NGC 1777 is positioned in the remote outer regions of the LMC, with its colour-magnitude diagram (CMD) showing similarity to other LMC clusters and indicating no significant metallicity gradient within the studied sample. Photometric studies, including integrated UBV and CCD (B, V, R) photometry, reveal a faint, circular appearance in telescopes. The surrounding stellar field contains stars in the age range of 1–3 billion years, suggesting a shared formation history with the cluster.

== See also ==
- List of NGC objects (1001-2000)
- List of NGC objects
