= Carina OB1 =

OB association in the Carina Nebula

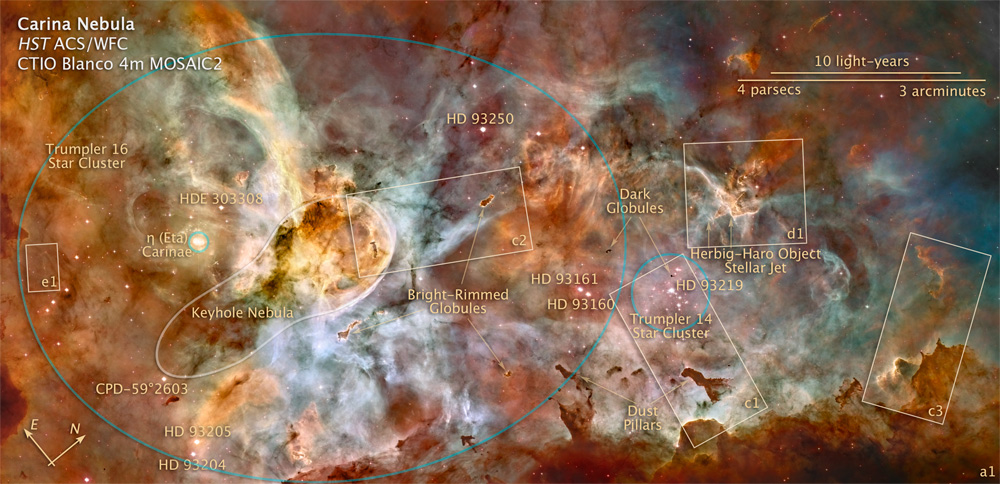
Labelled map of Carina OB1

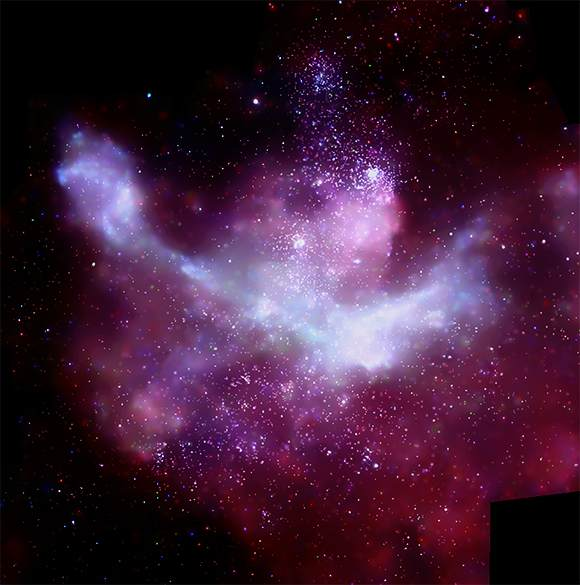
Chandra image of Carina OB1

Carina OB1 is a giant OB association in the Carina Nebula, which is home to some of the most massive and luminous stars in the Milky Way Galaxy. It includes the young star clusters Collinder 228, NGC 3293, NGC 3324, IC 2581, Trumpler 14, Trumpler 15 and Trumpler 16, the last being the home of Eta Carinae. It also includes another massive and luminous star, HD 93129A. It is approximately 2,680 parsecs (8,700 ly) from Earth.

It is one of the largest known stellar associations, along with Sagittarius OB5 and Cygnus OB2. It is much easier to see than that of the other associations since Carina OB1 has relatively little dust extinction in its region. Together with Carina OB2, they compromise the most massive stellar grouping known in the galaxy.

Carina OB1 is about 70 light-years (21 pc) across, and is the most massive stellar association in the Milky Way Galaxy since it lies within an active emission nebula. It contains many hot luminous stars which share common characteristics.
