= HD 93129 =

Triple star system in the constellation Carina

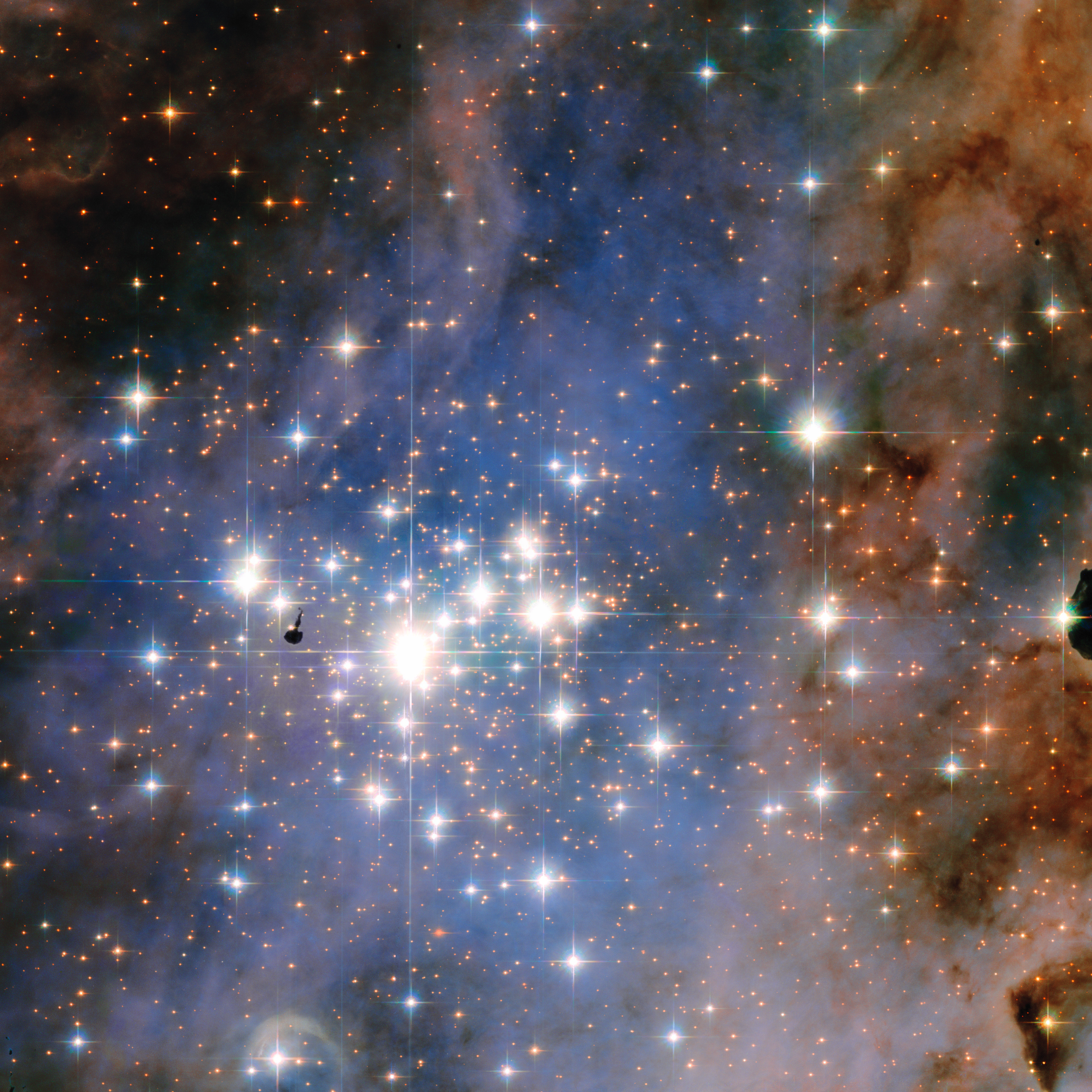
- HD 93129 surrounded by the lesser stars of Trumpler 14; Credit: NASA & ESA, Jesús Maíz Apellániz (Instituto de Astrofisica de Andalucia)

Observation data Epoch J2000 Equinox ICRS
- Constellation: Carina
- Right ascension: 10^{h} 43^{m} 57.46^{s}
- Declination: −59° 32′ 51.3″
- Apparent magnitude (V): 6.90 (7.310 + 8.84)

Characteristics

A
- Spectral type: O2If^{*} (O2If+O3.5V)
- U−B color index: −0.81
- B−V color index: +0.25

B
- Evolutionary stage: main sequence
- Spectral type: O3.5 V((f))z
- U−B color index: −0.79
- B−V color index: +0.23

Astrometry
Radial velocity (R_{v})	−0.4±7.4 km/s
Proper motion (μ)	RA: -5.0 mas/yr Dec.: 17.0 mas/yr
Distance	2,300 pc
Absolute magnitude (M_{V})	(A): −6.5 (−6.1 + −5.2) (B): −4.9

Details

Aa
Mass	110 M_{☉}
Radius	22.5 R_{☉}
Luminosity	1,480,000 L_{☉}
Surface gravity (log g)	3.71 cgs
Temperature	42,500 K
Rotational velocity (v sin i)	130 km/s
Age	0.9+0.2 −0.4 Myr

Ab
Mass	70 M_{☉}
Radius	13.1 R_{☉}
Luminosity	575,000 L_{☉}
Temperature	44,000 K

B
Mass	52 M_{☉}
Radius	13 R_{☉}
Luminosity	575,000 L_{☉}
Surface gravity (log g)	3.92 cgs
Temperature	44,000 K
Rotational velocity (v sin i)	112 km/s

Other designations
- CD−58°3528, Trumpler 14 1, CCDM J10440-5933, WDS J10440-5933
- A: TYC 8626-2805-1, ALS 15862, LS 1820
- B: ALS 19309

Database references
SIMBAD	HD 93129
- HD 93129 A
- HD 93129 B

HD 93129 is a triple star system in the Carina Nebula, with all three components being hot O class stars amongst the most luminous stars in the Milky Way. It is the dominant member of the Trumpler 14 star cluster, a young star cluster within the Carina OB1 stellar association that harbors other super-luminous stars, like Eta Carinae and WR 25.

== Location ==
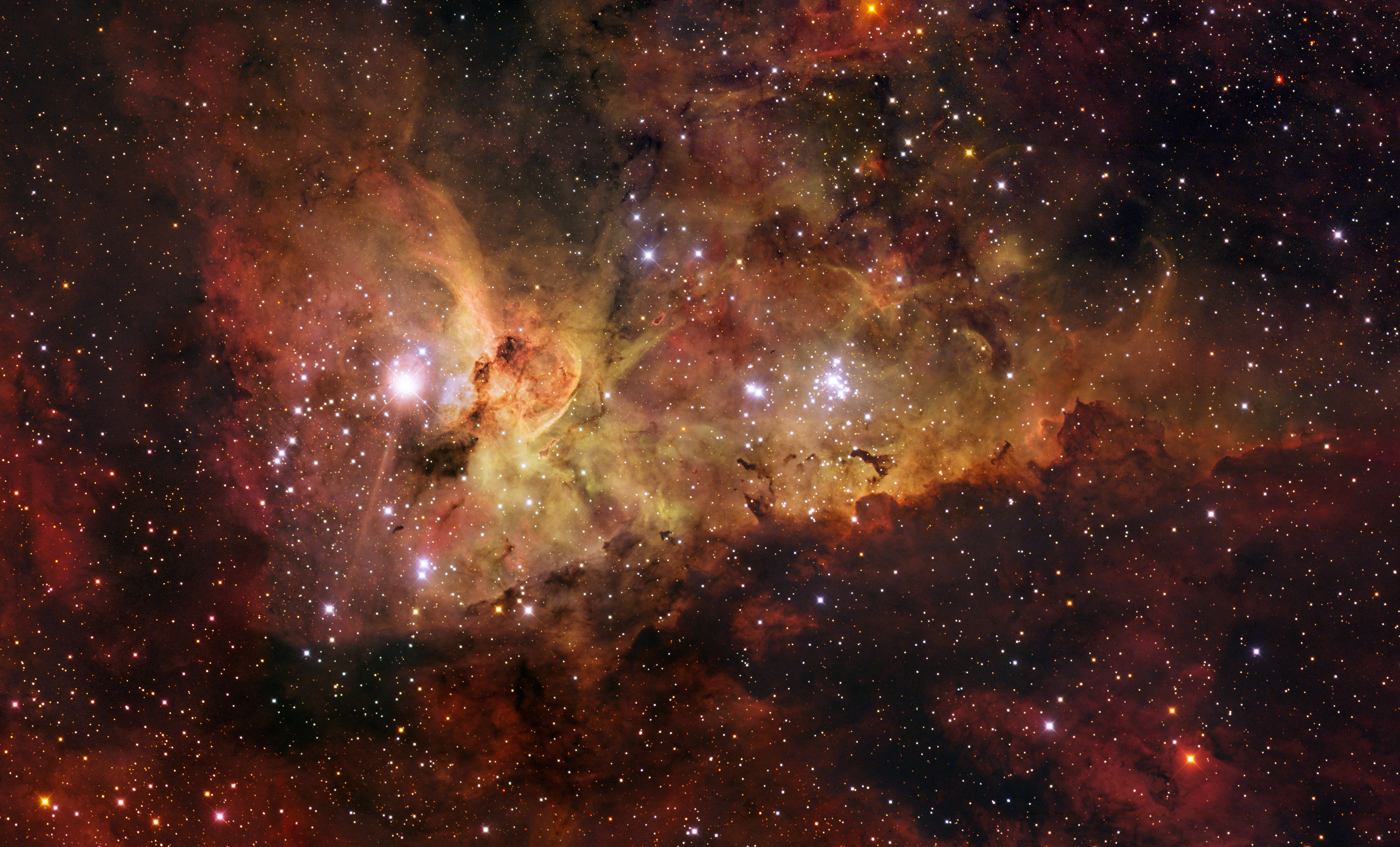
The Carina Nebula, with η Carinae on the left and Trumpler 14 just right of center

HD 93129 is found at the centre of the massive Trumpler 14 open cluster in the Carina Nebula star forming region. It is too far away for its distance to have been accurately determined using the annual parallax method, but accurate distances for η Carinae and the Homunculus Nebula, modelling of clusters, and astrophysical data about other stars assumed to be within the same region, all lead to a distance around 2,300 parsecs. HD 93129 Aa is the closest O2 supergiant to Earth.

That volume of space is home to many other massive and luminous stars. HD 93128, yet another O3.5 main sequence star, is only 24' away within Trumpler 14, and HD 93250 and HD 93205 are two more O3.5 stars in the larger Trumpler 16 cluster around η Carinae. There are also three Wolf-Rayet stars, an O4 supergiant, many other class O stars, and the unique η Carinae itself.

== System ==
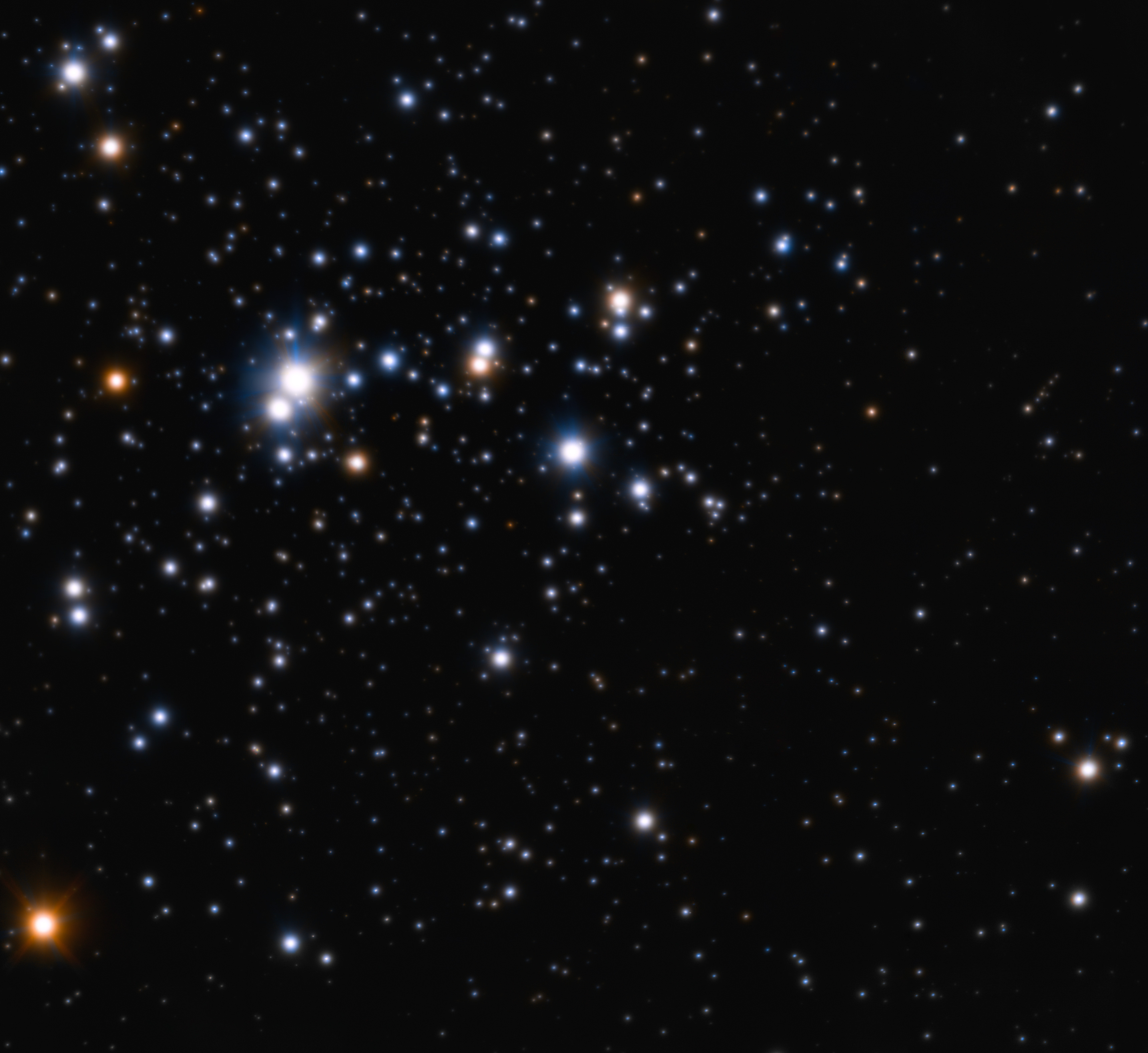
Image of the star cluster Trumpler 14 with HD 93129 A being the brightest star in the image, and HD 93129 B close but clearly resolved

HD 93129 consists of two clearly resolved components, HD 93129 A and HD 93129 B, and HD 93129 A itself is made up of two much closer stars.

HD 93129 A has been resolved into two components. The spectrum is dominated by the brighter component, although the secondary is only 0.9 magnitudes fainter. HD 93129 Aa is an O2 supergiant and Ab is an O3.5 main sequence star. Their separation has decreased from 55 mas in 2004 to only 27 mas in 2013, but an accurate orbit is not available.

HD 93129 B is an O3.5 main-sequence star 3 arc-seconds away from the closer pair. It is about 1.5 magnitudes fainter than the combined HD 93129 A, and approximately the same brightness as HD 93129 Ab.

A further 5 fainter stars within 5 arc-seconds have been detected, between five and seven magnitudes fainter at infrared wavelengths.

== Properties ==
All three stars of HD 93129 are among the most luminous in the galaxy; 1,480,000 L_{☉} for the supergiant primary and 575,000 L_{☉} for each of the other two stars. They are also among the hottest, with the supergiant at 42,500 K and the other two at 52,000 K. The stars have masses calculated to be between 70 M_{☉} and 110 M_{☉}.

HD 93129Aa has left the main sequence and its age is estimated to be around 900,000 years. The existence of the zero-age main sequence stars within Trumpler 14 suggest its age may be less than 600,000 years.

== See also ==
- Trumpler 14
- Mystic Mountain
- List of most massive stars
