= Trumpler 14 =

Open cluster in the constellation Carina

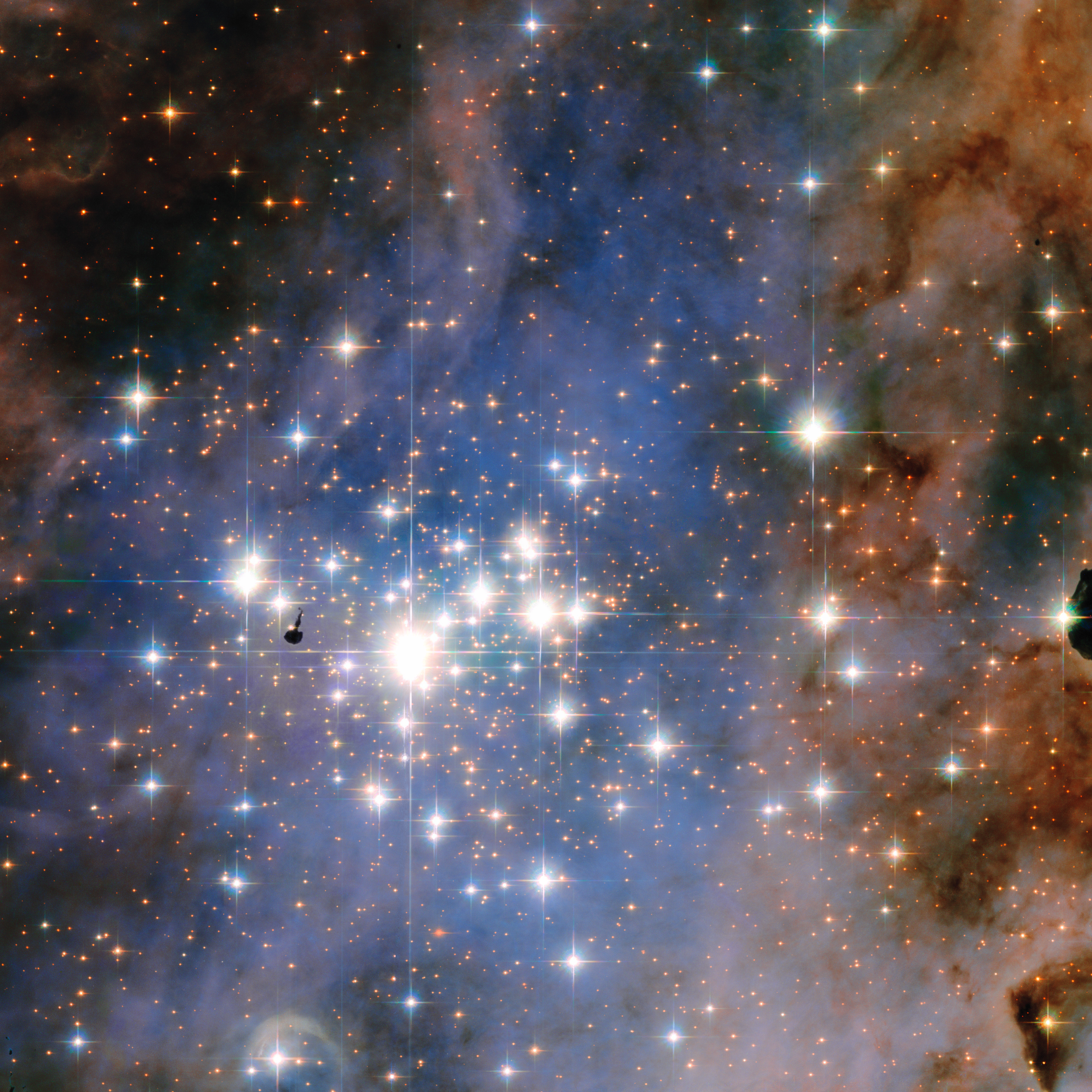
- HST ACS visible and infrared image

Observation data (J2000 epoch)
- Right ascension: 10^{h} 43^{m} 56^{s}
- Declination: −59° 33′ 00″
- Distance: 8,980 ly (2,753 pc)
- Apparent magnitude (V): 5.5

Physical characteristics
- Mass: 4.3+3.3 −1.5×10^{3} M_{☉}
- Estimated age: 300000–500000 years
- One of the youngest known star clusters
- Other designations: Cr 230, C 1041-593, Cl VDBH 102, [DBS2003] 54, [KPR2004b] 263, [KPS2012] MWSC 1846

Associations
- Constellation: Carina

Trumpler 14 (Tr 14) is an open cluster with a diameter of six light-years (1.8 pc), located within the inner regions of the Carina Nebula, approximately 8,980 light-years (2,753 pc) from Earth. Together with the nearby Trumpler 16, they are the main clusters of the Carina OB1 stellar association, which is the largest association in the Carina Nebula, although Trumpler 14 is not as massive or as large as Trumpler 16.

About 2000 stars have been identified in Trumpler 14 and the total mass of the cluster is estimated to be 4,300 M_{☉}.

== Age ==
It is one of the youngest known star clusters, estimates range from 300 to 500 thousand years old. For comparison, the massive super star cluster R136 is about 1 to 2 million years old, and the famous Pleiades is about 115 million years old.

== Members ==
Due to its location within the inner parts of the Carina Nebula, Trumpler 14 is currently undergoing massive star formation. As a result, the star cluster exhibits many stars of late O to early A spectral type, which are very massive (at least 10 solar masses), short-lived and hot (20000 K). The brightest member is HD 93129, a triple system consisting of three individual class O stars. It also contains HD 93128, an O3.5 V((fc))z star, an extremely hot and young main sequence star.

Prominent stars
Star name	MJ number	Effective temperature	Absolute magnitude	Bolometric magnitude	Mass (M_{☉})	Spectral type	Ref.
HD 93129	177	42500+44000+44000	−6.5 + −4.9	−7.5	110+70+52	O2If+O3.5V+O3.5V((f))z	
HD 93128	157	51300	−5.4	−10	75	O3.5V((fc))z	
HD 93160	229	42700	−5.9	−9.9	62	O6III	
HD 303311	351	46100	−5	−9.2	51	O5V	
CPD-58 2611	115	43600	−4.6	−8.6	39	O6V	
HD 305524	404	39800	−5	−8.8	37		
CPD-58 2620	192	42400	−4.3	−8.3	35	O6.5V	
	165	38500	−4.8	−8.5	34	O8V	
HD 305516	36	43600	−4	−8.1	33		
HD 305532	593	40800	−4.3	−8.2	33		
CPD-59 2610	449	42300	−4	−7.9	31		
CPD-58 2627	203	39800	−4.1	−7.9	29		

== Future ==
In a few million years, as its stars die, it will trigger the formation of metal-rich stars, and in a few hundred million years Trumpler 14 will probably dissipate.

== Gallery ==
Image of the Carina OB1 association. Trumpler 14 is the massive cluster of stars at the upper right of center.

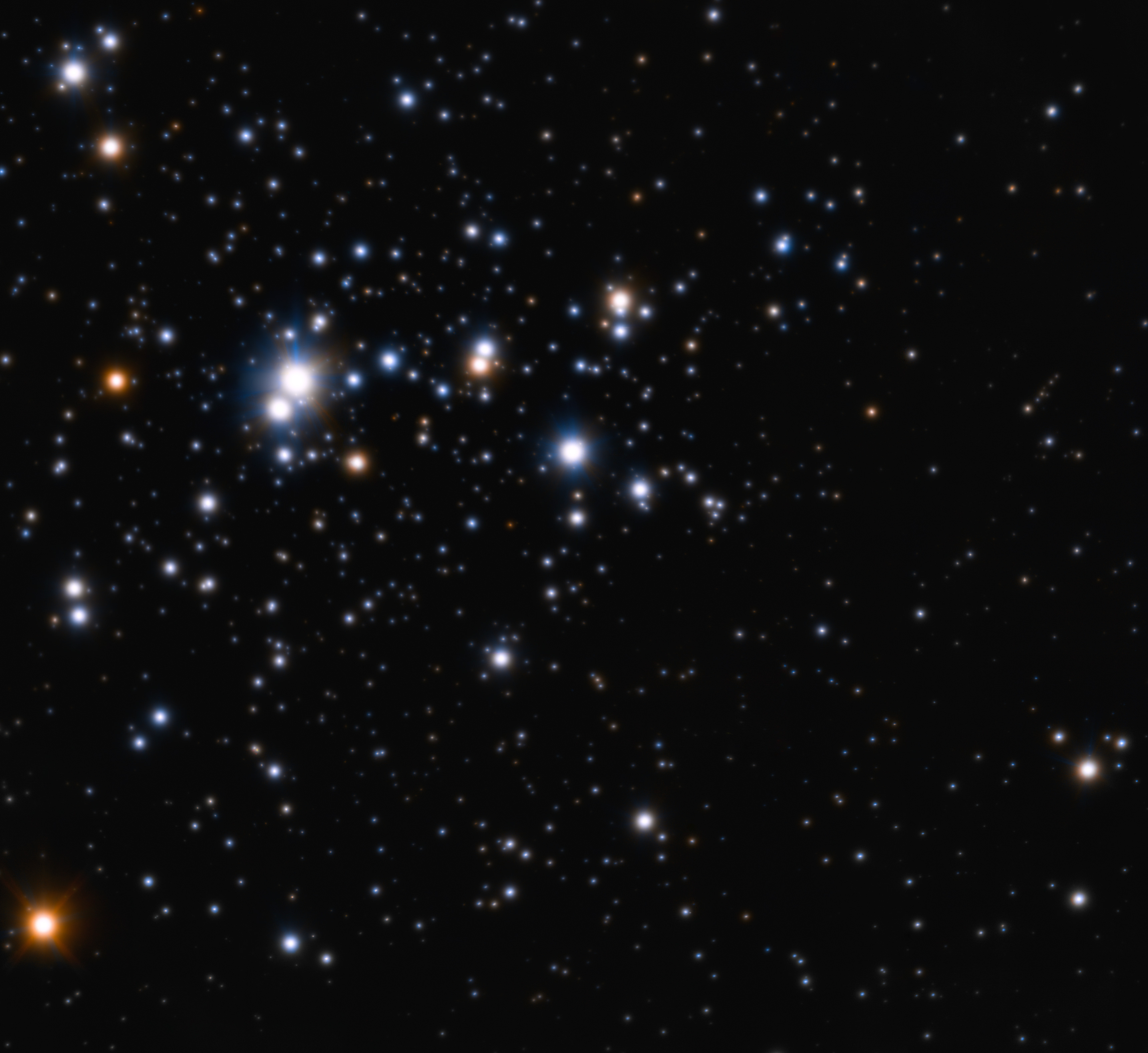
Trumpler 14 as seen by the Multi-conjugate Adaptive optics Demonstrator (MAD) mounted on ESO's Very Large Telescope (VLT). Image is based on a combination of K and H filters. Field of view is about two arcminutes across.

== See also ==
- List of most massive stars
