= Carina Nebula =

Interstellar clouds in the constellation Carina

Emission nebula
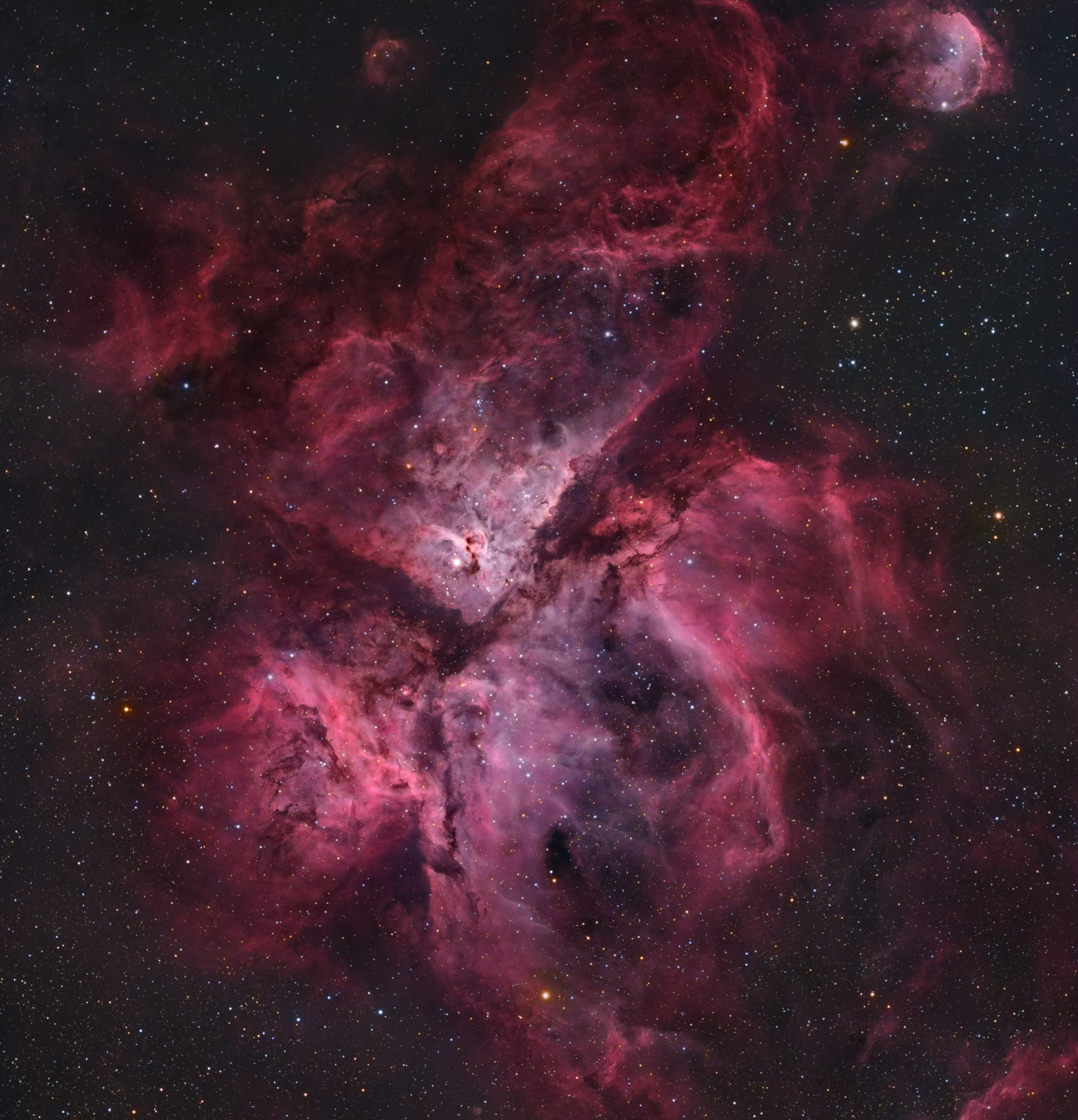
- The Carina Nebula. Eta Carinae and the Keyhole Nebula are left of center, NGC 3324 is at upper right.

Observation data: J2000.0 epoch
- Right ascension: 10^{h} 45^{m} 08.5^{s}
- Declination: −59° 52′ 04″
- Distance: ~8,500 ly (~2,600 pc)
- Apparent magnitude (V): +1.0
- Apparent dimensions (V): 2°
- Constellation: Carina

Physical characteristics
- Radius: ~230 ly (~70 pc)
- Notable features: Eta Carinae; Keyhole Nebula; Many open clusters & dark nebulae
- Designations: NGC 3372, ESO 128-EN013, GC 2197, h 3295, Caldwell 92

The Carina Nebula or Eta Carinae Nebula is a large, complex area of bright and dark nebulosity in the constellation Carina, located in the Carina–Sagittarius Arm of the Milky Way galaxy. Alternatively, it is known as NGC 3372 or the Great Carina Nebula. The nebula is approximately 8,500 light-years (2,600 pc) from Earth.

The nebula has within its boundaries the large Carina OB1 association and several related open clusters, including numerous O-type stars and several Wolf–Rayet stars. Carina OB1 encompasses the star clusters Trumpler 14 and Trumpler 16. Trumpler 14 is one of the youngest known star clusters at half a million years old and contains stars like the O2 supergiant HD 93129A. Trumpler 16 is the home of many extremely luminous stars, such as WR 25 and the Eta Carinae star system. Trumpler 15, Collinder 228, Collinder 232, NGC 3324, and NGC 3293 are also considered members of the association. NGC 3293 is the oldest and furthest from Trumpler 14, indicating sequential and ongoing star formation.

The nebula is one of the largest diffuse nebulae in Earth's sky. Although it is four times as large as and even brighter than the famous Orion Nebula, the Carina Nebula is much less well known due to its location in the southern sky. It was discovered by Nicolas-Louis de Lacaille in 1752 from the Cape of Good Hope.

The Carina Nebula was selected as one of five cosmic objects observed by the James Webb Space Telescope, as part of the release of its first official science images. A detailed image was made of an early star-forming region of NGC 3324 known as the Cosmic Cliffs.

== Discovery and basic information ==
Nicolas-Louis de Lacaille discovered the nebula on 25 January 1752. Its dimensions are 120×120 arcminutes centered on the coordinates of right ascension 10^{h} 45^{m} 08.5^{s} and declination −59° 52′ 04″. In modern times it is calculated to be around 8,500 light-years (2,600 pc) from Earth.

== Objects within the Carina Nebula ==
=== Eta Carinae ===
The Cosmic Cliffs at the edge of NGC 3324, one of the first images taken by the James Webb Space Telescope

False-color image of the Carina nebula, with red for sulfur, green for hydrogen, and blue for oxygen emissions.

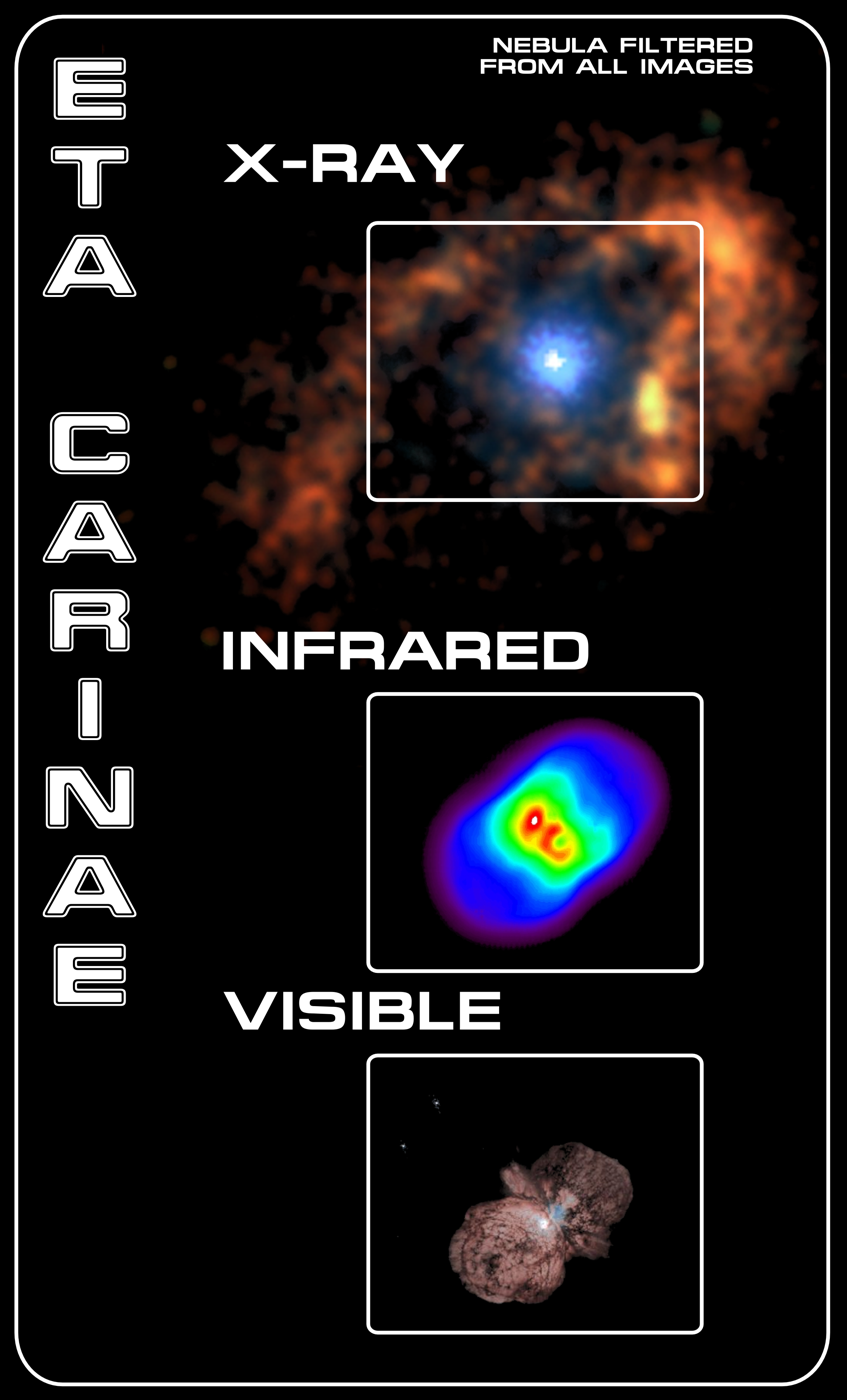
Eta Carinae observed in different wavelengths

Eta Carinae is a highly luminous hypergiant star. Estimates of its mass range from 100 to 150 times the mass of the Sun, and its luminosity is about four million times that of the Sun.

This object is currently the most massive star that can be studied in great detail because of its location and size. Several other known stars may be more luminous and more massive, but data on them is far less robust. (Caveat: Since improved data have demoted examples such as the Pistol Star, one should be skeptical of most available lists of "most massive stars". In 2006, Eta Carinae still had the highest confirmed luminosity, based on data across a broad range of wavelengths.) Stars with more than 80 times the mass of the Sun produce more than a million times as much light as the Sun. They are quite rare—only a few dozen in a galaxy as big as ours—and they flirt with disaster near the Eddington limit, i.e., the outward pressure of their radiation is almost strong enough to counteract gravity. Stars that are more than 120 solar masses exceed the theoretical Eddington limit, and their gravity is barely strong enough to hold in its radiation and gas, resulting in a possible supernova or hypernova in the near future.

Eta Carinae's effect on the nebula is directly visible. Dark globules and some other less visible objects have tails pointing directly away from the massive star. The entire nebula would have looked very different before the Great Eruption in the 1840s, which surrounded Eta Carinae with dust, drastically reducing the amount of ultraviolet light it put into the nebula.

=== Homunculus Nebula ===
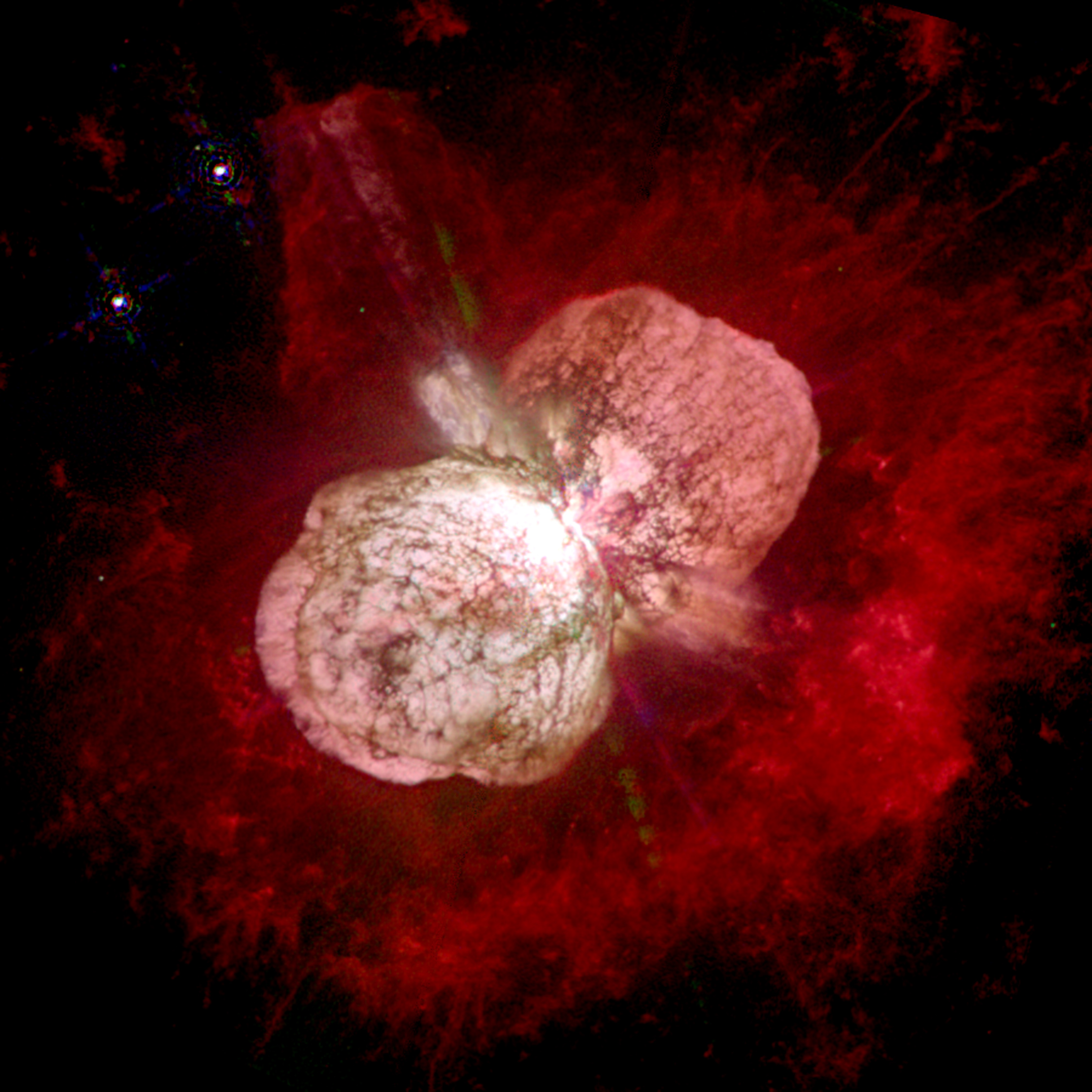
Eta Carinae, surrounded by the Homunculus Nebula

Within the large bright nebula is a much smaller feature, immediately surrounding Eta Carinae itself, known as the Homunculus Nebula (from Latin meaning Little Man). It is believed to have been ejected in an enormous outburst in 1841, which briefly made Eta Carinae the second-brightest star in the sky.

The Homunculus Nebula is a small H II region, with gas shocked into ionized and excited states. It also absorbs much of the light from the extremely luminous central stellar system and re-radiates it as infrared (IR). It is the brightest object in the sky at mid-IR wavelengths.

The distance to the Homunculus can be derived from its observed angular dimensions and calculated linear size, assuming it is axially symmetric. The most accurate distance obtained using this method is 7,660 ± 160 light-years (2,350 ± 50 pc). The largest radius of the bipolar lobes in this model is about 22,000 AU, and the axis is oriented 41° from the line of sight, or 49° relative to the plane of the sky, which means it is seen from Earth slightly more "end on" than "side on".

=== Keyhole Nebula ===
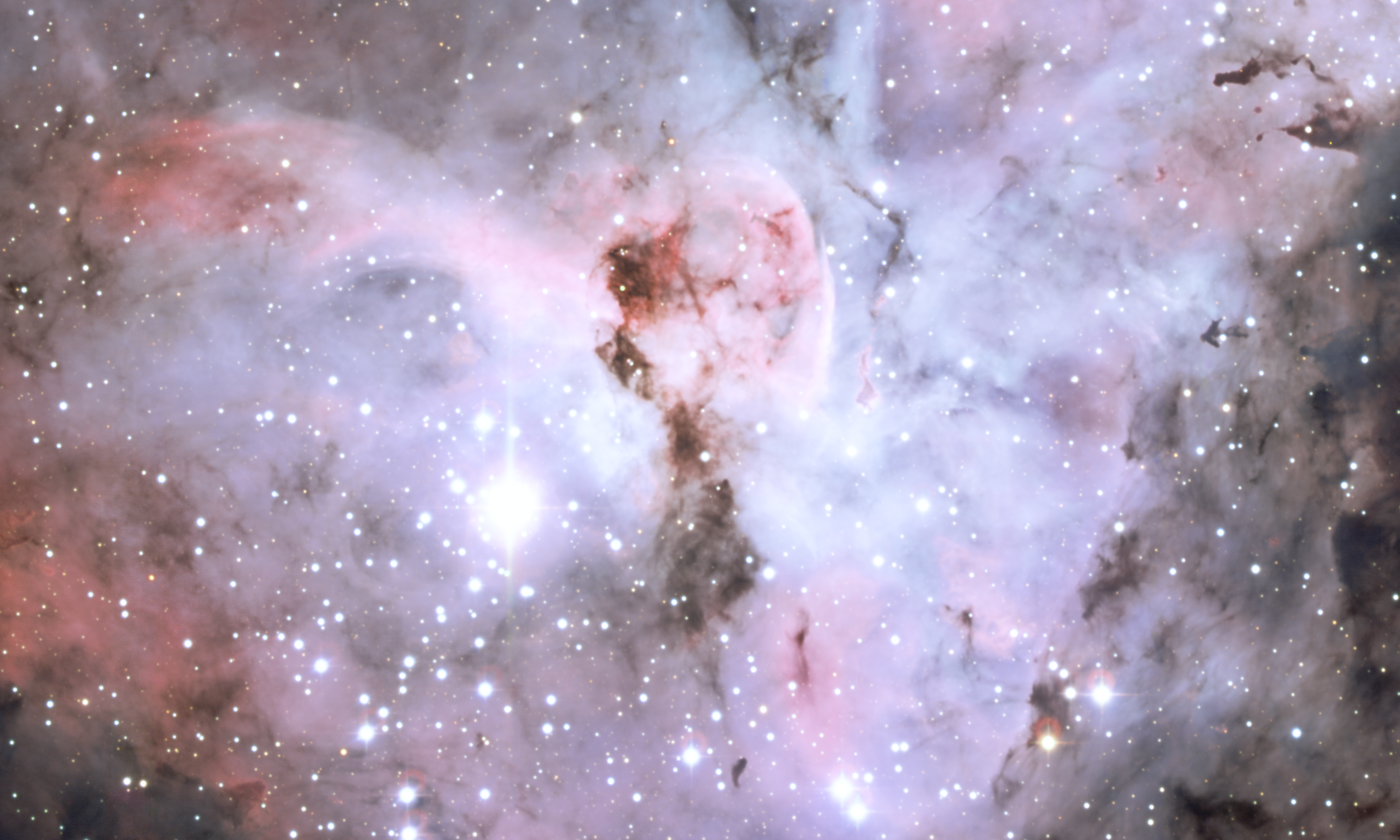
The Keyhole Nebula is a dark nebulosity superimposed on the brightest part of the Carina Nebula.

The Keyhole, or Keyhole Nebula, is a small dark cloud of cold molecules and dust within the Carina Nebula, containing bright filaments of hot, fluorescing gas, silhouetted against the much brighter background nebula. John Herschel used the term "lemniscate-oval vacuity" when first describing it, and subsequently referred to it simply as the "oval vacuity". The term lemniscate continued to be used to describe this portion of the nebula until popular astronomy writer Emma Converse described the shape of the nebula as "resembling a keyhole" in an 1873 Appleton's Journal article. The name Keyhole Nebula then came into common use, sometimes for the Keyhole itself, sometimes to describe the whole of the Carina Nebula (signifying "the nebula that contains the Keyhole").

The diameter of the Keyhole structure is approximately seven light-years (2.1 pc). Its appearance has changed significantly since it was first observed, possibly due to changes in the ionizing radiation from Eta Carinae. The Keyhole does not have its own NGC designation. It is sometimes erroneously called NGC 3324, but that catalogue designation refers to a reflection and emission nebula just northwest of the Carina Nebula (or to its embedded star cluster).

=== Defiant Finger ===
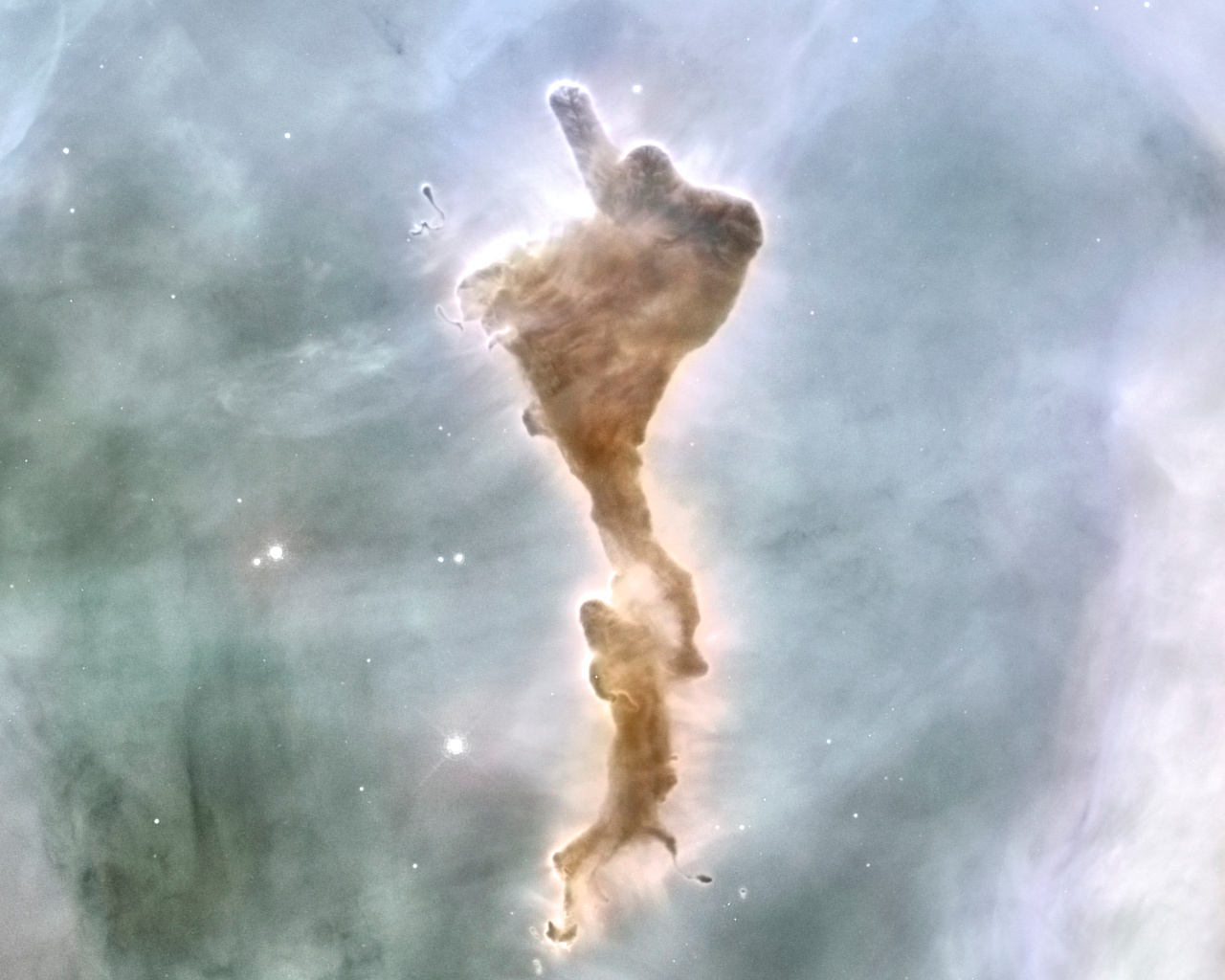
Hubble image of the Defiant Finger. North is down.

A small Bok globule in the Keyhole Nebula (at RA 10h 44m 30s, Dec −59° 40') has been photographed by the Hubble Space Telescope and is nicknamed the "Carina Defiant Finger" due to its shape. In Hubble images, light can be seen radiating off the edges of the globule; this is especially visible in the southern tip, where the "finger" is. It is thought that the Defiant Finger is ionized by the bright Wolf–Rayet star WR 25, and/or Trumpler 16-244, a bright blue supergiant. It has a mass of at least 6 M_{☉}, and stars may be forming within it. Like other interstellar clouds under intense radiation, the Defiant Finger will eventually be completely evaporated; for this cloud, the time frame is predicted to be 200,000 to 1,000,000 years.

=== Trumpler 14 ===
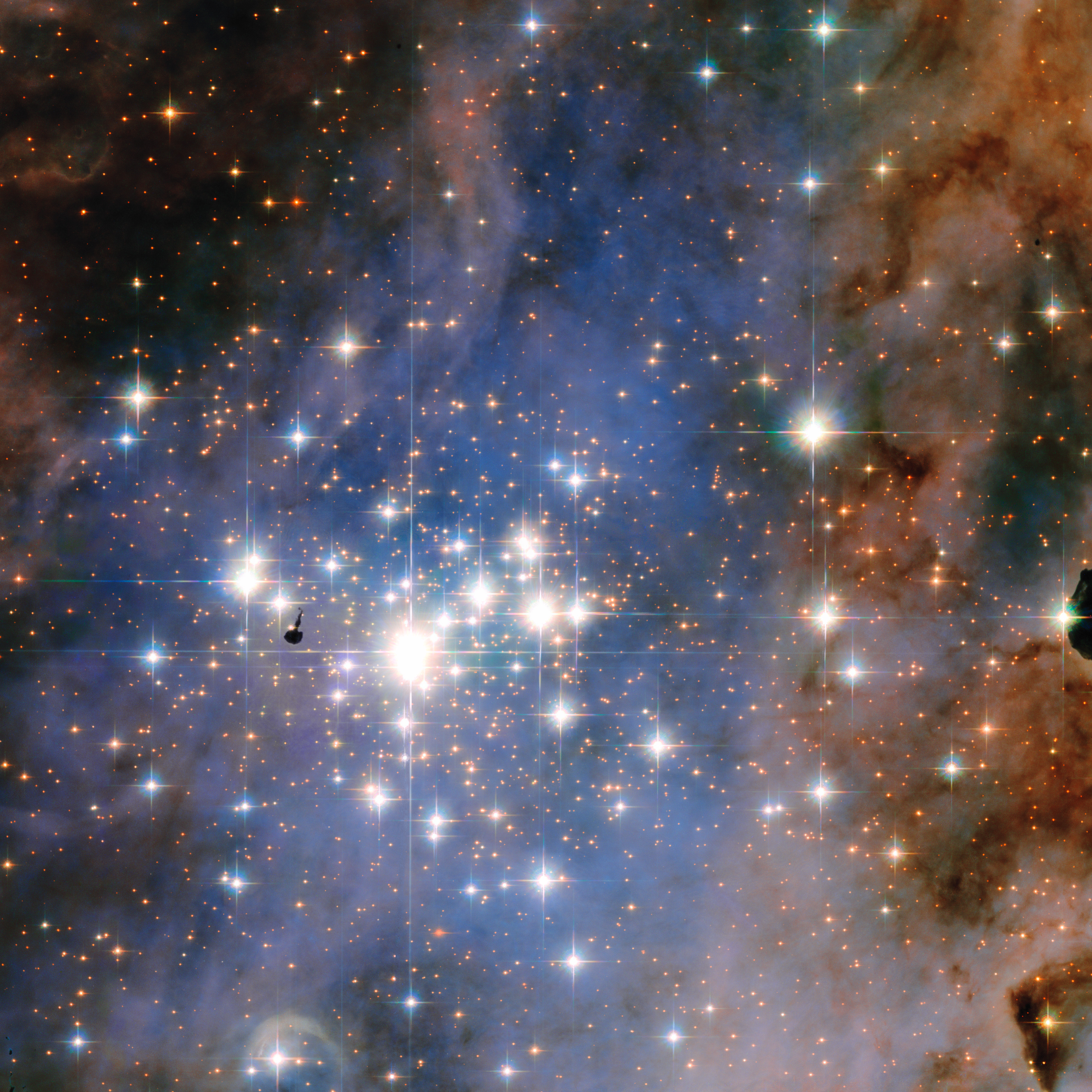
Hubble image of the open cluster Trumpler 14

Trumpler 14 is an open cluster with a diameter of six light-years (1.8 pc), located within the inner regions of the Carina Nebula, approximately 8,000 light-years (2,500 pc) from Earth. It is one of the main clusters of the Carina OB1 stellar association, which is the largest association in the Carina Nebula. About 2,000 stars have been identified in Trumpler 14. and the total mass of the cluster is estimated to be 4,300 M_{☉}.

=== Trumpler 15 ===
Trumpler 15 is a star cluster on the north-east edge of the Carina Nebula. Early studies disagreed about the distance, but astrometric measurements by the Gaia mission have confirmed that it is the same distance as the rest of Carina OB1.

=== Trumpler 16 ===
Trumpler 16 is one of the main clusters of the Carina OB1 stellar association, which is the largest association in the Carina Nebula, and it is bigger and more massive than Trumpler 14. The star Eta Carinae is part of this cluster.

=== Mystic Mountain ===
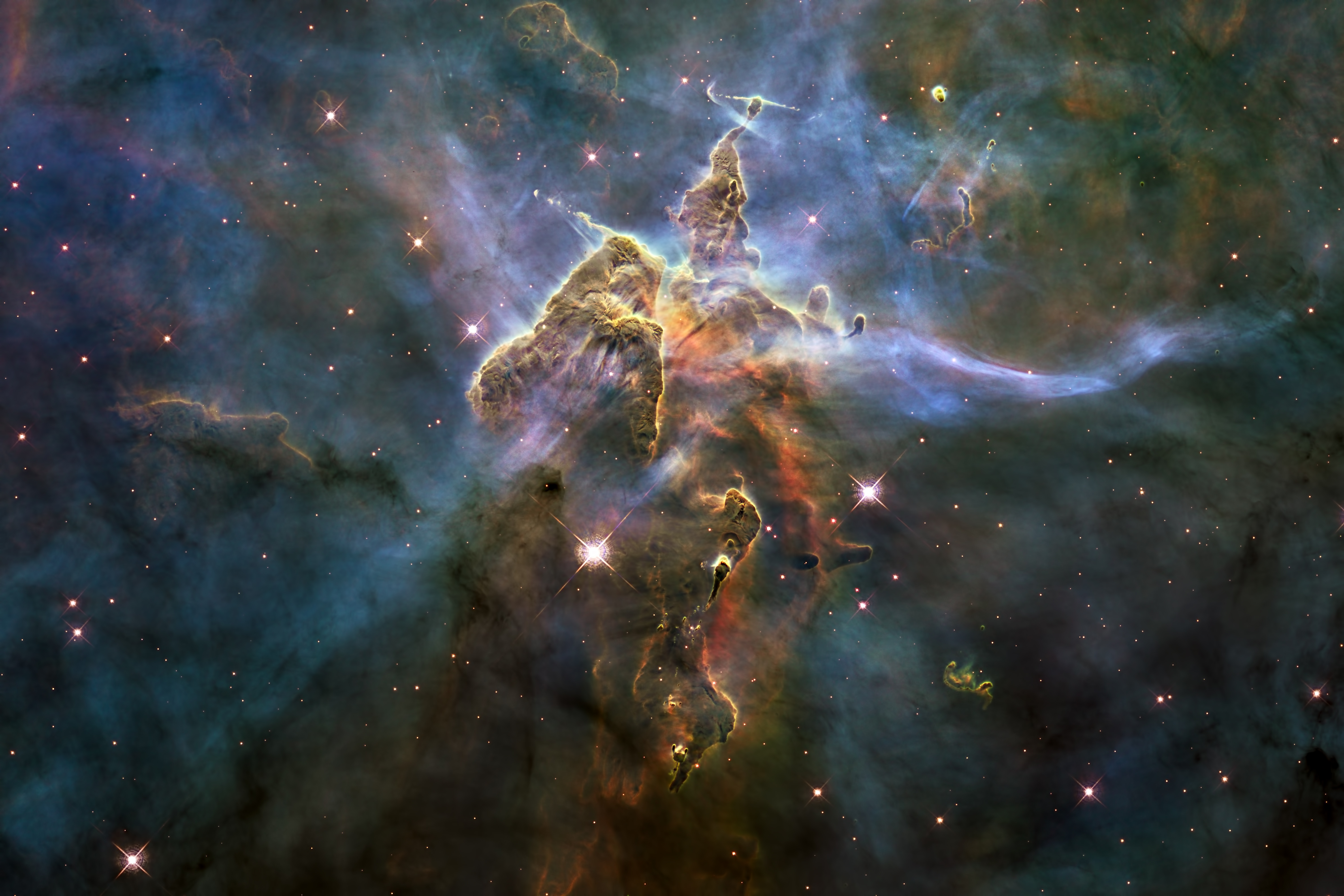
Mystic Mountain

Mystic Mountain is the term for a dust–gas pillar in the Carina Nebula, a photo of which was taken by Hubble Space Telescope on its 20th anniversary. The area was observed by Hubble's Wide Field Camera 3 on 1–2 February 2010. The pillar measures three light-years (0.92 pc) in height; nascent stars inside the pillar fire off gas jets that stream from towering “peaks”.

=== WR 22 ===
WR 22 is an eclipsing binary. The dynamical masses derived from orbital fitting vary from over 70 M_{☉} to less than 60 M_{☉} for the primary and about 21 to 27 M_{☉} for the secondary. The spectroscopic mass of the primary has been calculated at 74 M_{☉} or 78.1 M_{☉}.

=== South Pillars ===
Image of Cat's Head Nebula taken with Hubble's Wide Field Camera 3 instrument.

The south pillars are a group of large pillars south of Eta Carinae. They show signs of ongoing star formation in the form of Herbig-Haro objects and include the Cat's Head Nebula (HH 903), the Treasure Chest and the Axis of Evil (HH 666).

The Cat's Head Nebula (G287.88-0.93) is a dust pillar, or globule, at the top of a larger structure called the Giant Pillar, which was first described in a study with the Spitzer Space Telescope. It points roughly towards Eta Carinae. The globule, about 7,500 to 8,500 light-years away, was formed when ultraviolet radiation and winds from massive stars carved the pillar into its present shape. Its nickname comes from its resemblance to a sitting cat, and the bright "eye" suggests that a young star is partially hidden inside. The Herbig–Haro object HH 903, which emerges from the pillar, is a bipolar jet about 2 parsecs long, described in 2010 as one of the longest then known; its axis is almost perpendicular to that of the pillar, as with other jets in Carina. Images of the nebula taken with Hubble and the James Webb Space Telescope were published on 29 October 2026.

=== WR 25 ===
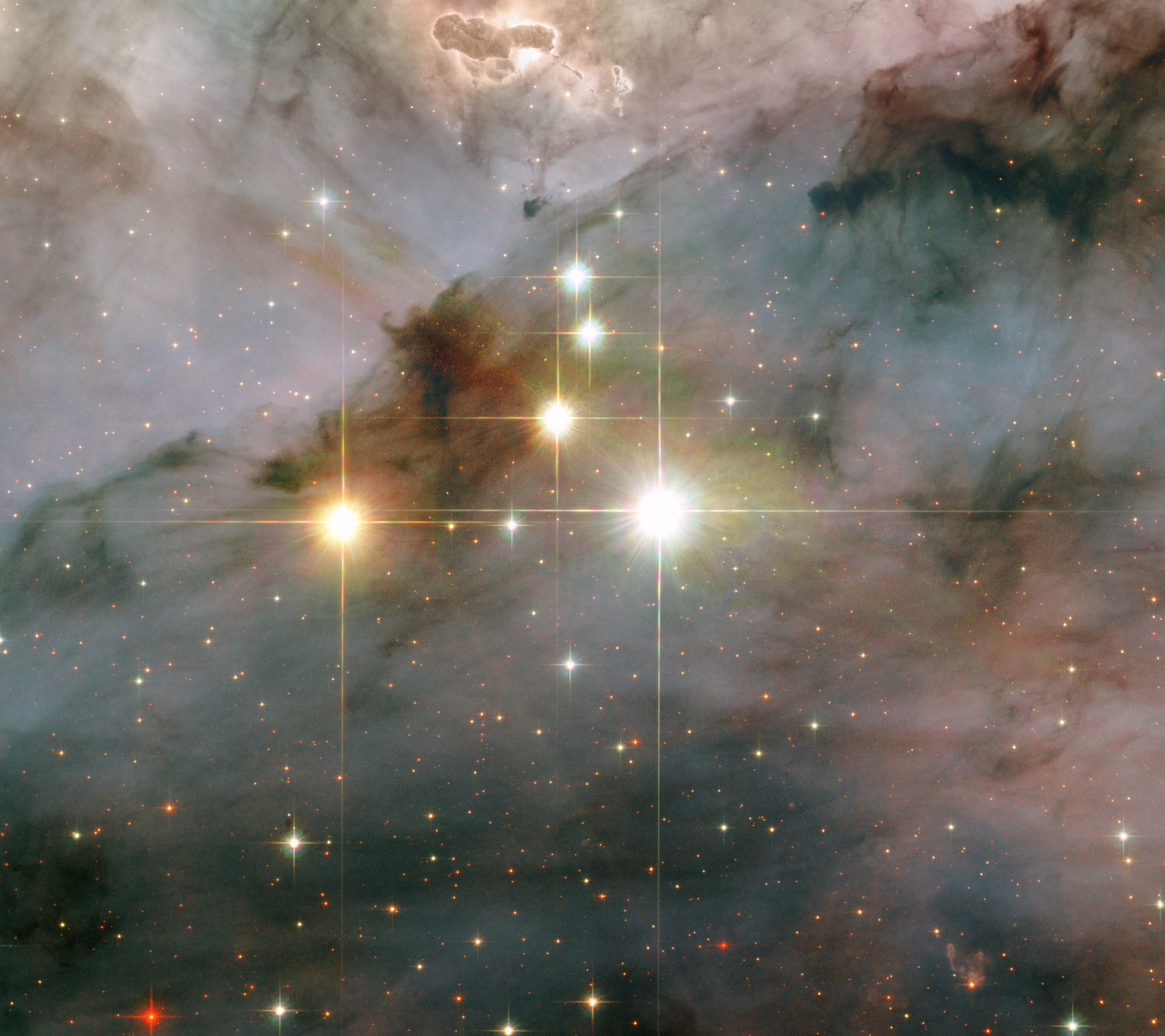
The brightest star is WR 25

WR 25 is a binary system in the central portion of the Carina Nebula, a member of the Trumpler 16 cluster. The primary is a Wolf–Rayet star, possibly the most luminous star in the galaxy. The secondary is hard to detect but thought to be a luminous OB star.

=== HD 93129 ===
HD 93129 is a triple star system of O-class stars in Carina. All three stars of HD 93129 are among the most luminous in the galaxy; HD 93129 consists of two clearly resolved components, HD 93129 A and HD 93129 B, and HD 93129 A itself is made up of two much closer stars.

HD 93129 A has been resolved into two components. The brighter component dominates the spectrum, although the secondary is only 0.9 magnitudes fainter. HD 93129 Aa is an O2 supergiant and Ab is an O3.5 main sequence star. Their separation has decreased from 55 milliarcseconds in 2004 to only 27 mas in 2013, but an accurate orbit is not available.

HD 93129 B is an O3.5 main-sequence star 3 arcseconds away from the closer pair. It is about 1.5 magnitudes fainter than the combined HD 93129 A, and is approximately the same brightness as HD 93129 Ab.

=== HD 93250 ===
HD 93250 is one of the brightest stars in the region of the Carina Nebula. It is only 7.5 arcminutes from Eta Carinae, and HD 93250 is considered to be a member of the same loose open cluster Trumpler 16, although it appears closer to the more compact Trumpler 14.

HD 93250 is known to be a binary star; however, individual spectra of the two components have never been observed, and they are thought to be very similar. The spectral type of HD 93250 has variously been given as O5, O6/7, O4, and O3. It has sometimes been classified as a main sequence star and sometimes as a giant star. The Galactic O-Star Spectroscopic Survey has used it as the standard star for the newly created O4 subgiant spectral type.

=== HD 93205 ===
HD 93205 is a binary system of two large stars.

The more massive member of the pair is an O3.5 main-sequence star. The spectrum shows some ionized nitrogen and helium emission lines, indicating some mixing of fusion products to the surface and a strong stellar wind. The mass calculated from apsidal motion of the orbits is 40 to 60 M_{☉}. This is somewhat lower than expected from evolutionary modeling of a star with its observed parameters.

The less massive member is an O8 main sequence star of approximately 20 M_{☉}. It moves in its orbit at a speed of over 300 km/s (190 mi/s) and is considered to be a relativistic binary, which causes the apses of the orbit to change predictably.

=== Catalogued open clusters in Carina Nebula ===
As of 1998, there are eight known open clusters in the Carina Nebula:

- Bochum 10 (Bo 10)
- Bochum 11 (Bo 11)
- Collinder 228 (Cr 228)
- Collinder 232 (Cr 232)
- Collinder 234 (Cr 234)
- Trumpler 14 (Tr 14, Cr 230)
- Trumpler 15 (Tr 15, Cr 231)
- Trumpler 16 (Tr 16, Cr 233)

== Annotated map ==
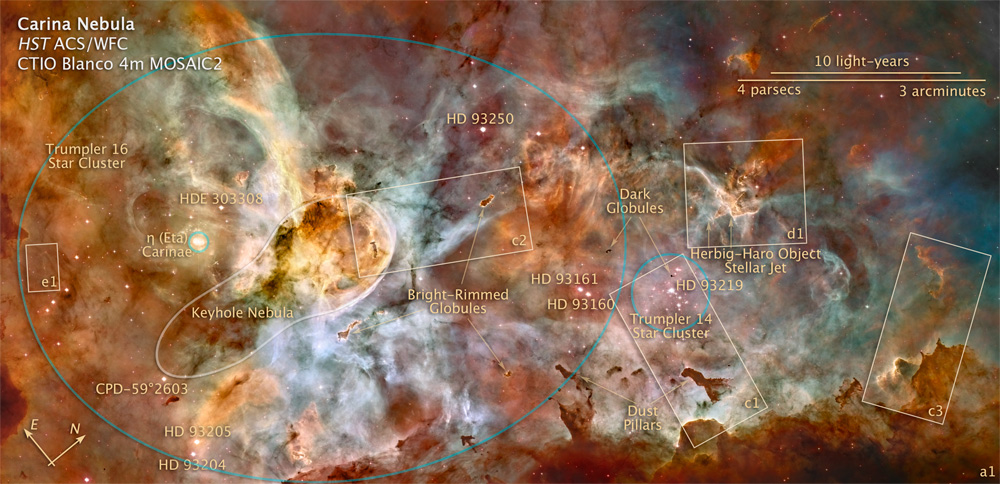
Annotated map of part of the Carina Nebula showing the location of various objects in the nebula. This view combines multiple ground and Hubble observatory images in a 50-light-year wide (15 pc) view.

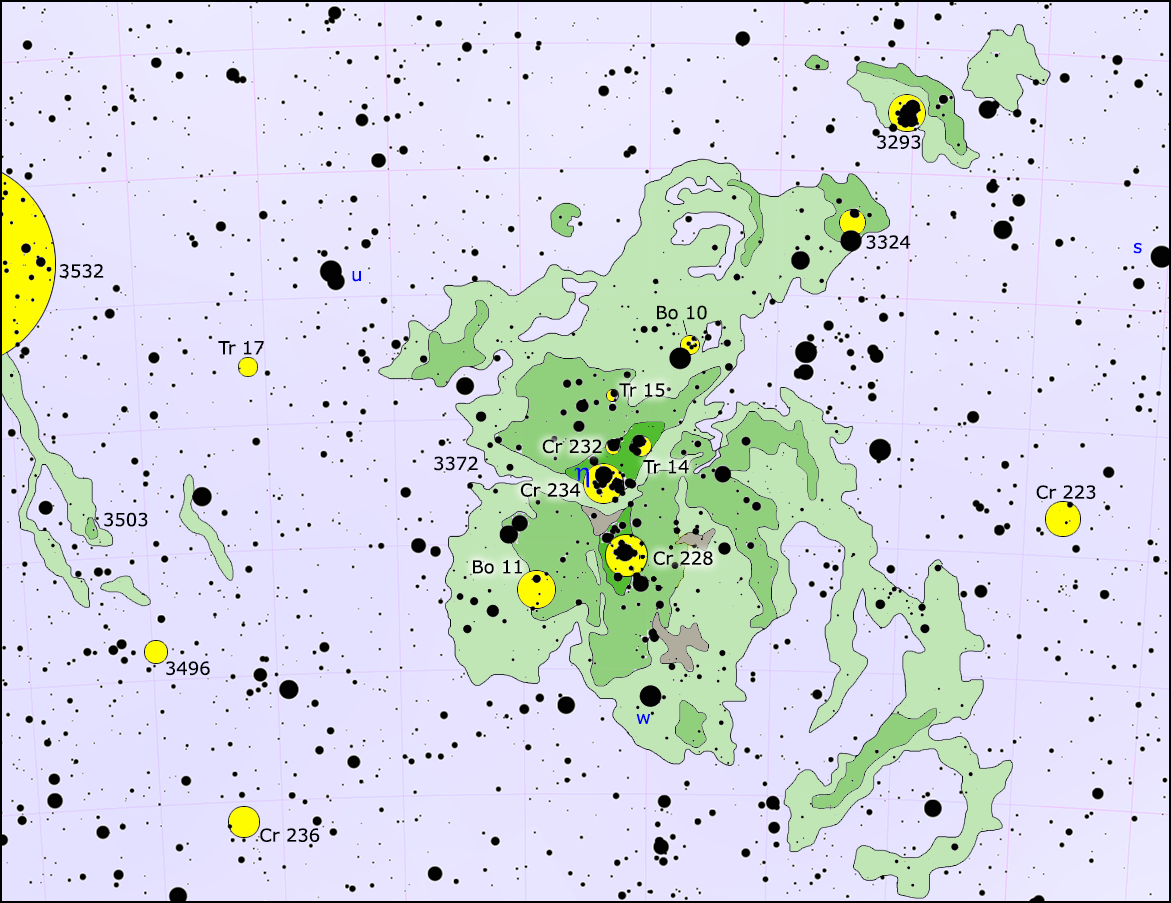
A celestial map of the nebula.

== Gallery ==
Overview of the Carina Nebula. The Keyhole is superimposed on the bright area above center, and Eta Carinae is the bright star just to its left.

Carina Nebula in infrared light

Spitzer mid-infrared view of the Carina Nebula with the South Pillars marked on the lower left

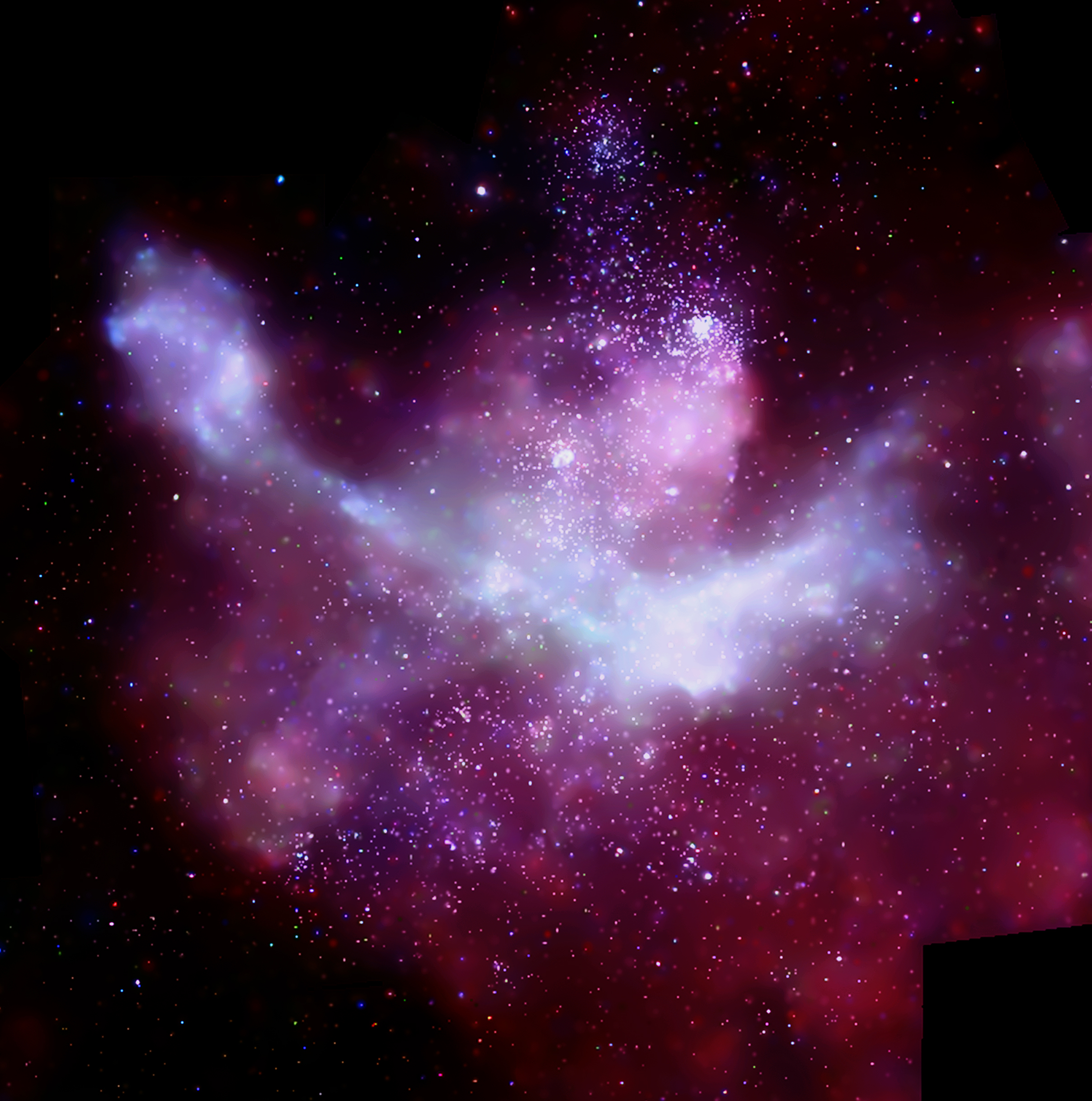
X-rays from stars and diffuse multimillion-Kelvin plasma light up the Carina Nebula in this Chandra X-ray Observatory image

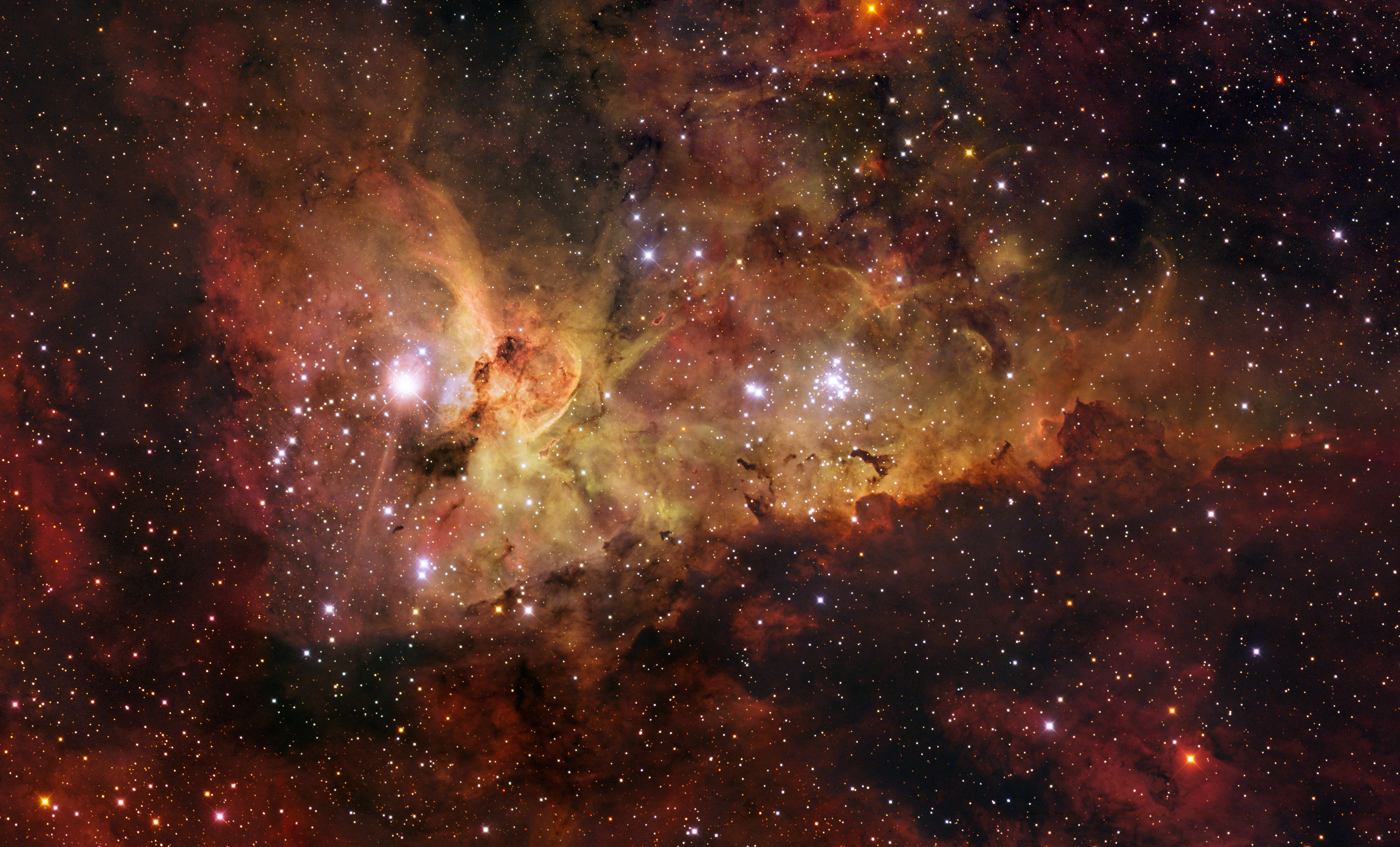
Close-up of the Carina Nebula's central region

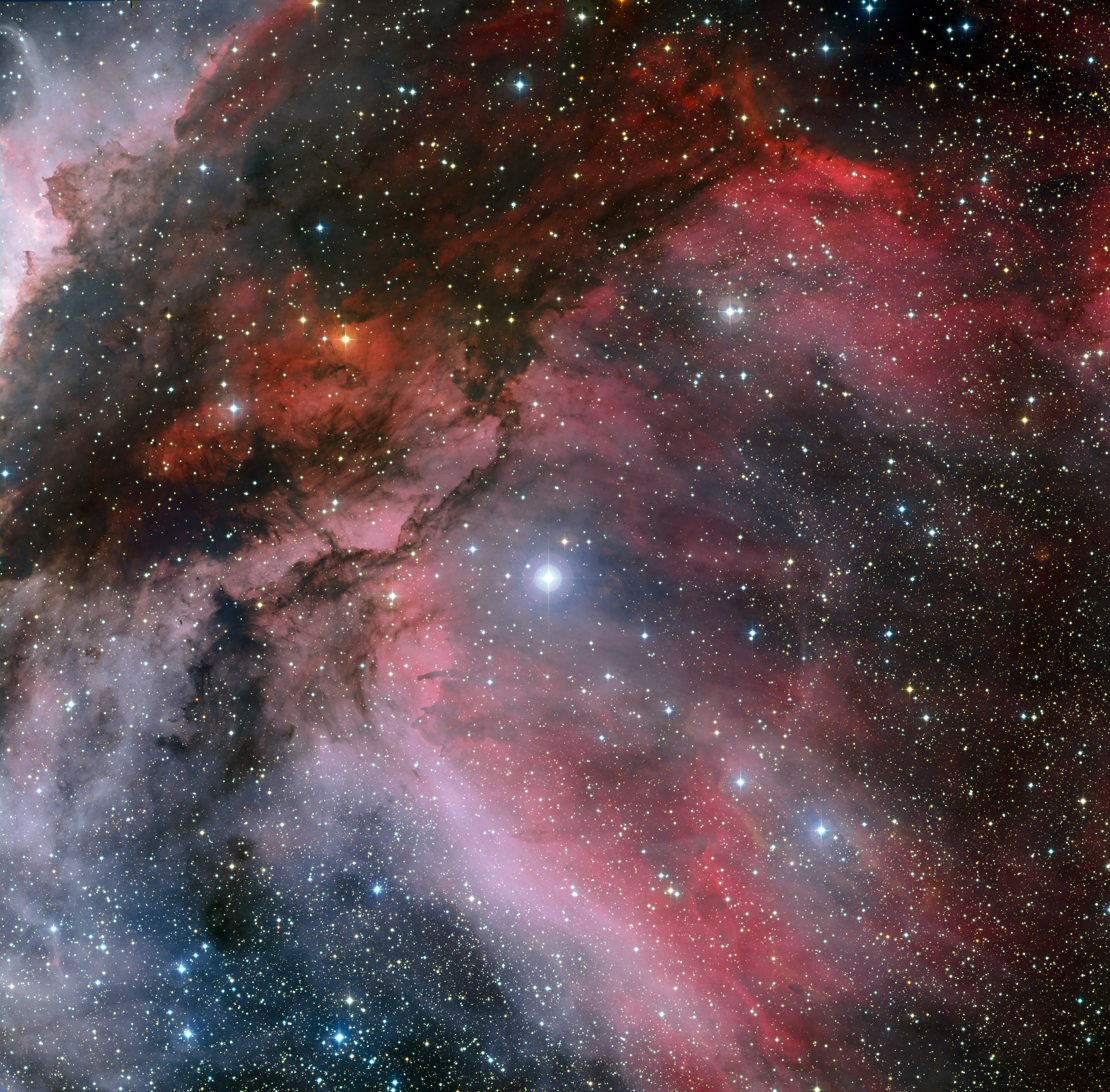
Wolf–Rayet star WR 22

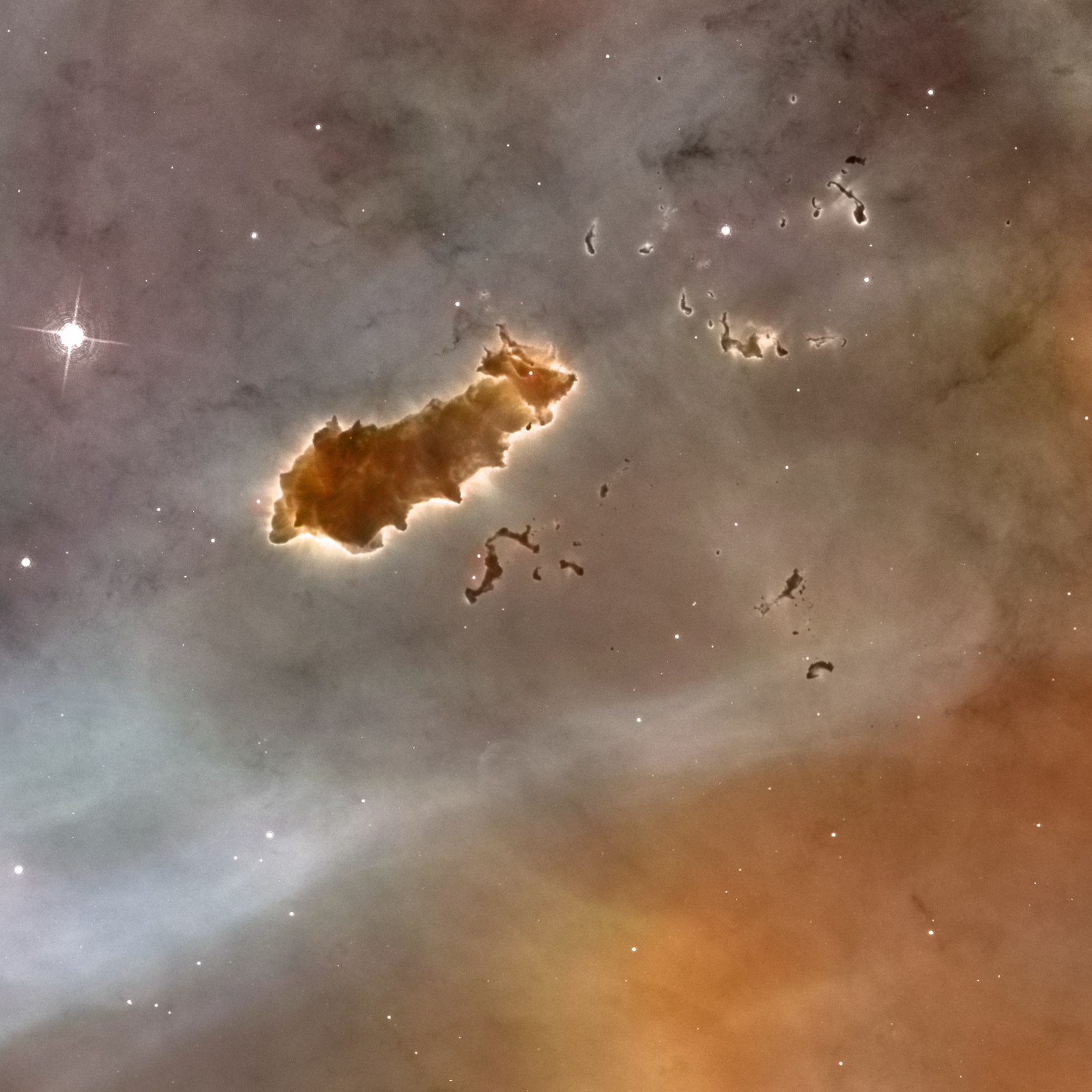
Bok globule nicknamed "The Caterpillar"

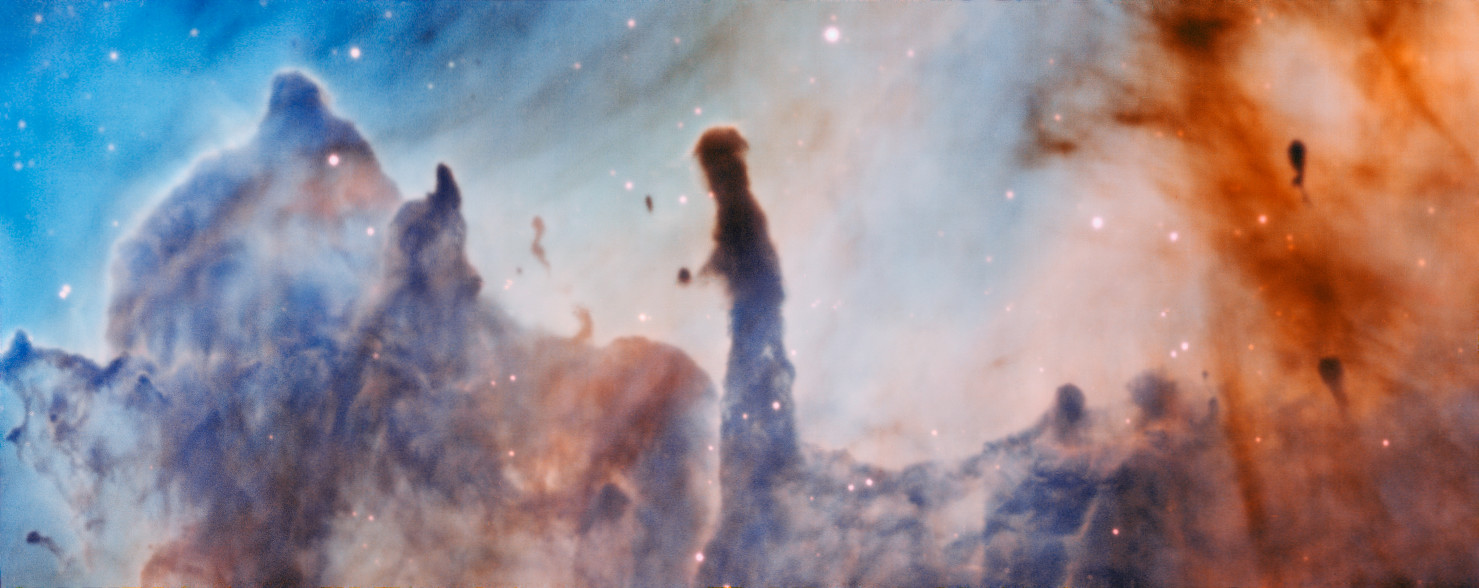
Region R44 in the Carina Nebula

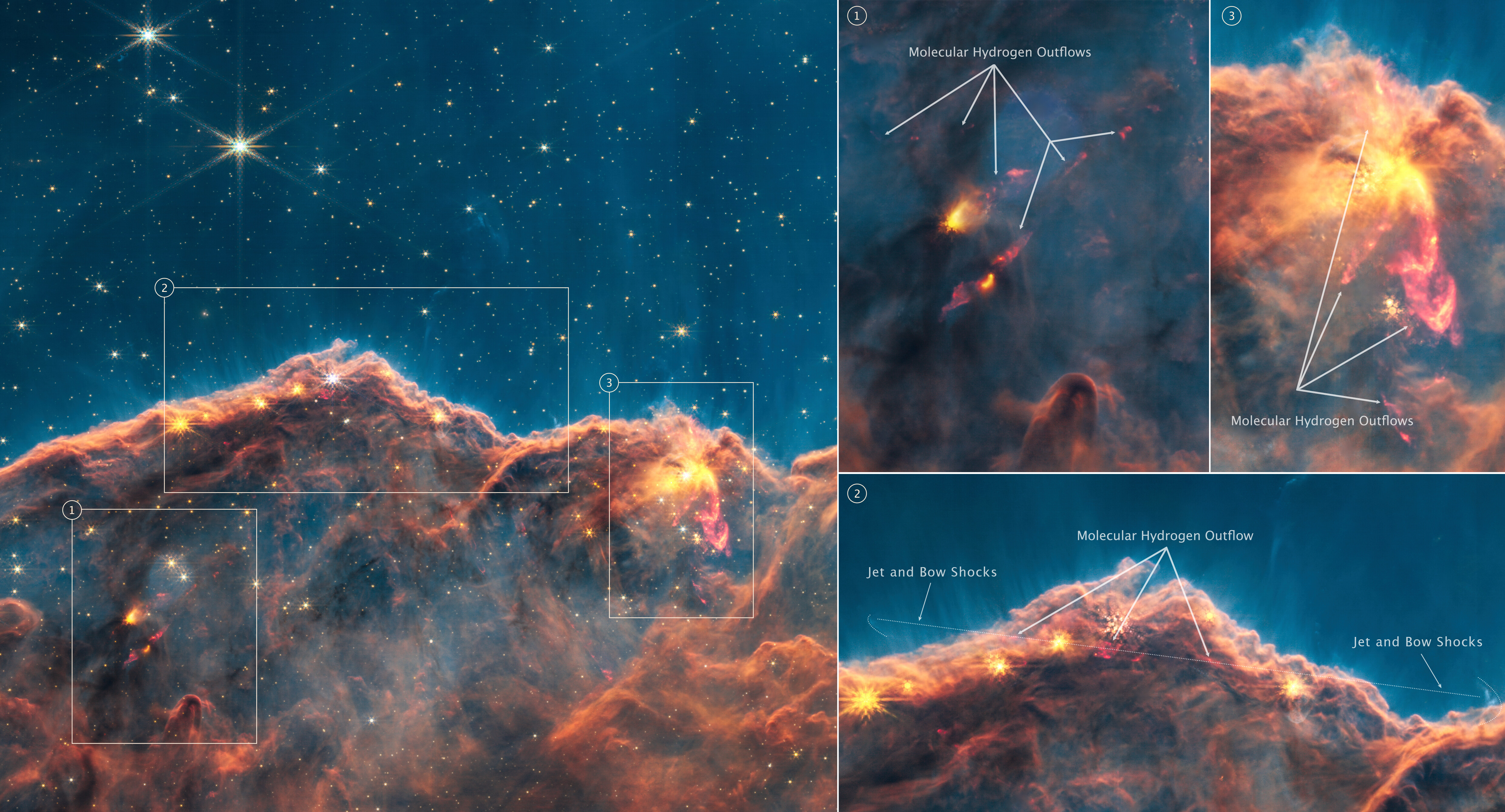
Scientists taking a “deep dive” into one of the iconic first images from the James Webb Space Telescope have discovered dozens of energetic jets and outflows from young stars previously hidden by dust clouds.

Detail of NGC 3372 taken by the VLT telescope

== See also ==
- Tarantula Nebula
