= NGC 3324 =

Open cluster in the constellation Carina

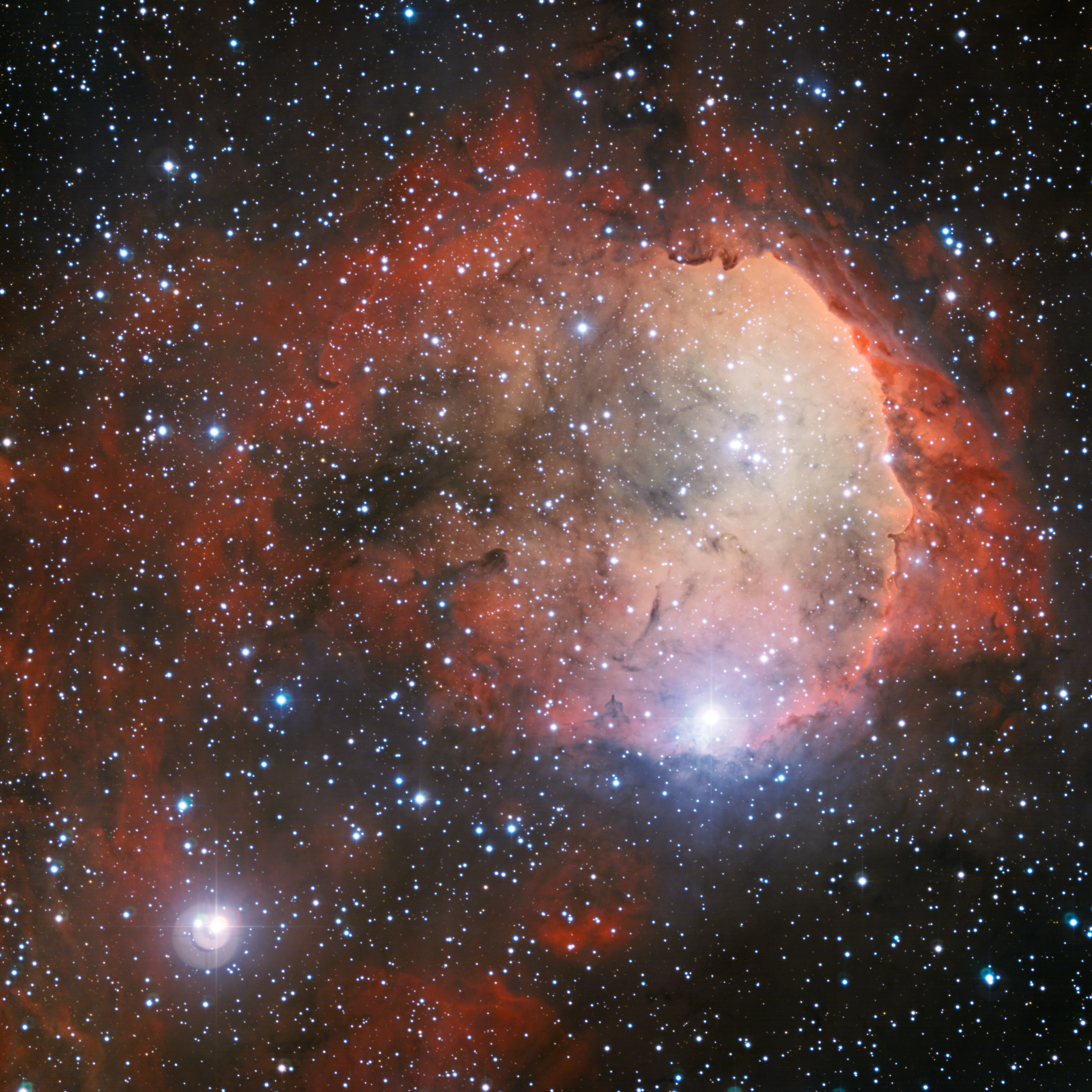
- NGC 3324 star-forming region (2.2-metre MPG/ESO telescope at La Silla Observatory)

Observation data (J2000 epoch)
- Right ascension: 10^{h} 37^{m} 20^{s}
- Declination: −58° 38′ 30″
- Distance: 9,100 ly (2,800 pc)
- Apparent dimensions (V): 11 arcmin

Physical characteristics
- Mass: 580 M_{☉}
- Radius: 15 ly (4.5 pc)
- Estimated age: 12 ± 3 Myr
- Other designations: ESO 128-EN006, Cr 225, Lund 552, h 3286, GC 2167, C 1035-583, OCl 819.0, [KPR2004b] 254, [KPS2012] MWSC 1830

Associations
- Constellation: Carina

NGC 3324 is an open cluster in the southern constellation of Carina, located northwest of the Carina Nebula (NGC 3372) at a distance of 9,100 ly (2,800 pc) from Earth. It is closely associated with the emission nebula IC 2599, also known as Gum 31. The two are often confused as a single object, and together have been nicknamed the "Gabriela Mistral Nebula" due to its resemblance to the Chilean poet. NGC 3324 was first catalogued by James Dunlop in 1826.

The Hubble Space Telescope observed a western section of NGC 3324 in detail, and the same section was among the first observations of the James Webb Space Telescope for comparison.

== Nearby clusters ==
NGC 3324 is associated with the open cluster NGC 3293. Both are fairly young, at around 12 million years old. They show some degree of mass segregation, with more massive stars concentrated near their centers. Neither are dynamically relaxed.

== Gallery ==
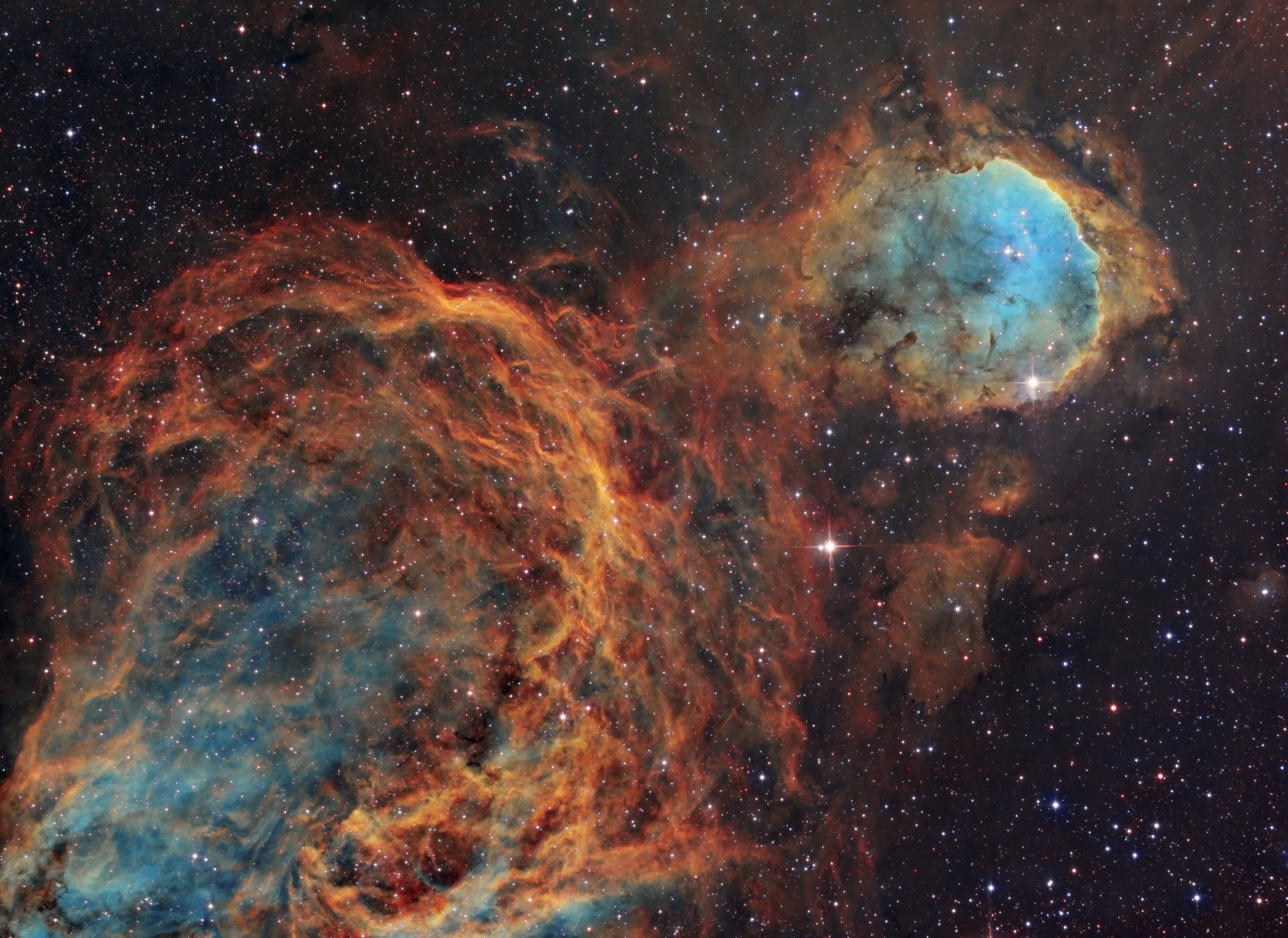
Astrophotography of NGC 3324 nebula in narrowband technique and Hubble palette (SHO)

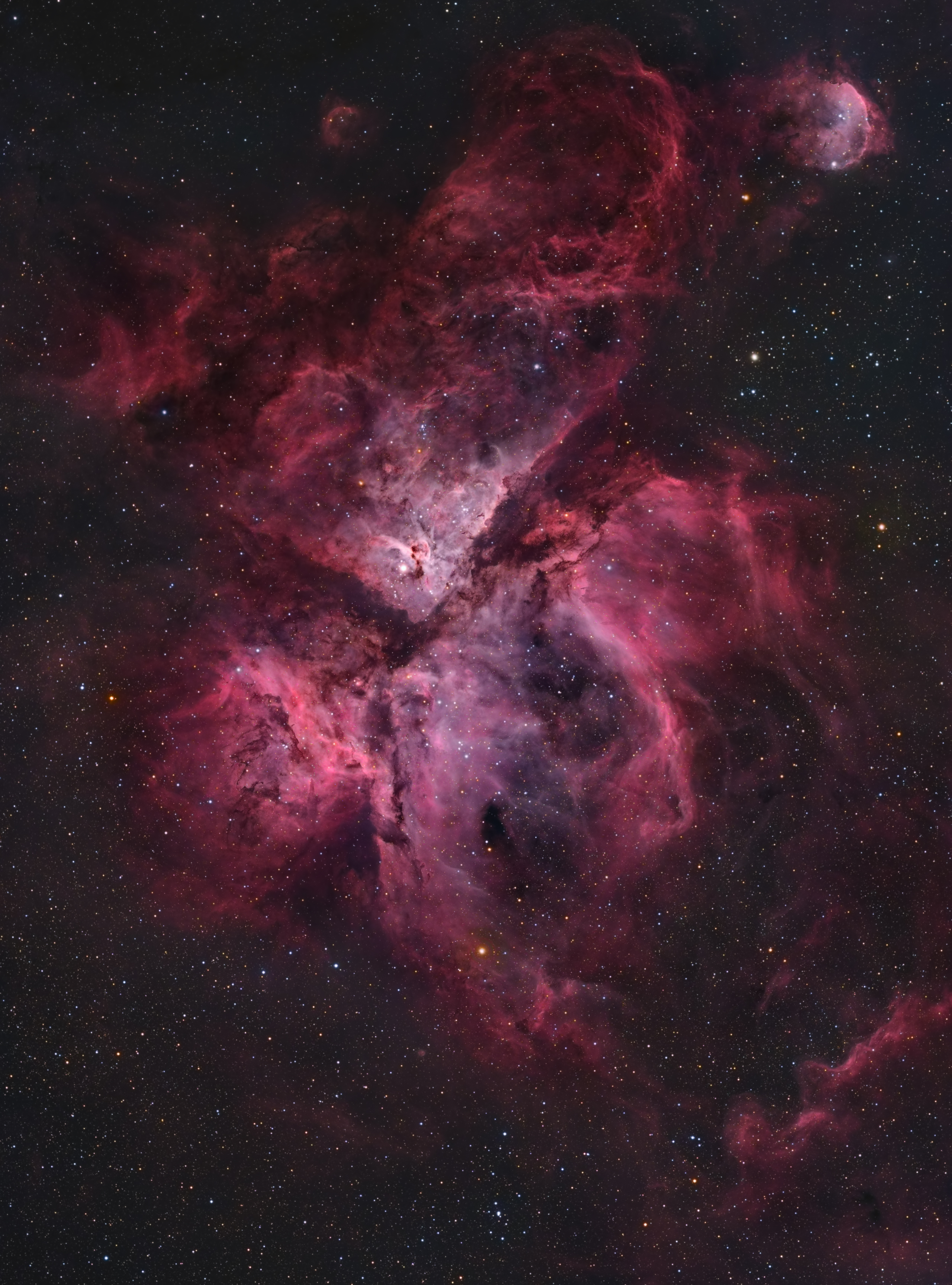
The Carina Nebula with NGC 3324 at top right

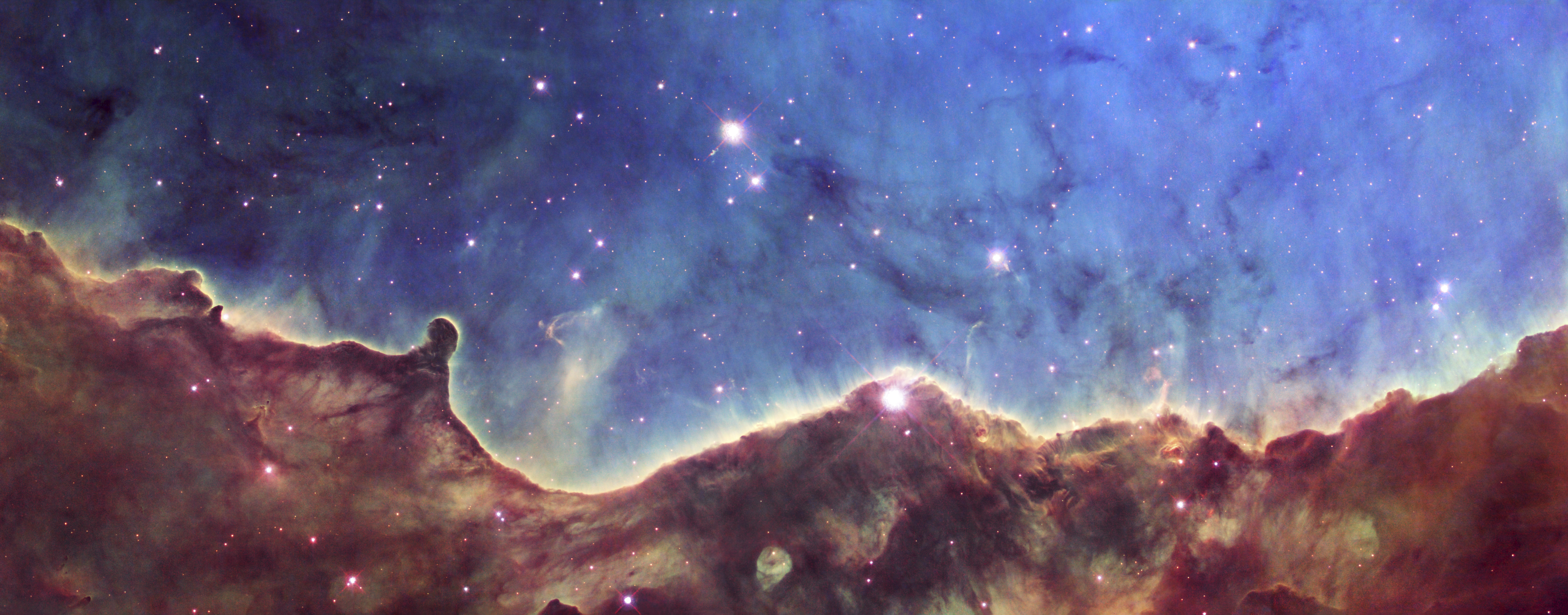
Hubble Space Telescope detail of a western section of NGC 3324 (north is to the right)

James Webb Space Telescope detail of the same western section, the "Cosmic Cliffs"
