= NGC 3293 =

Open cluster in the constellation Carina

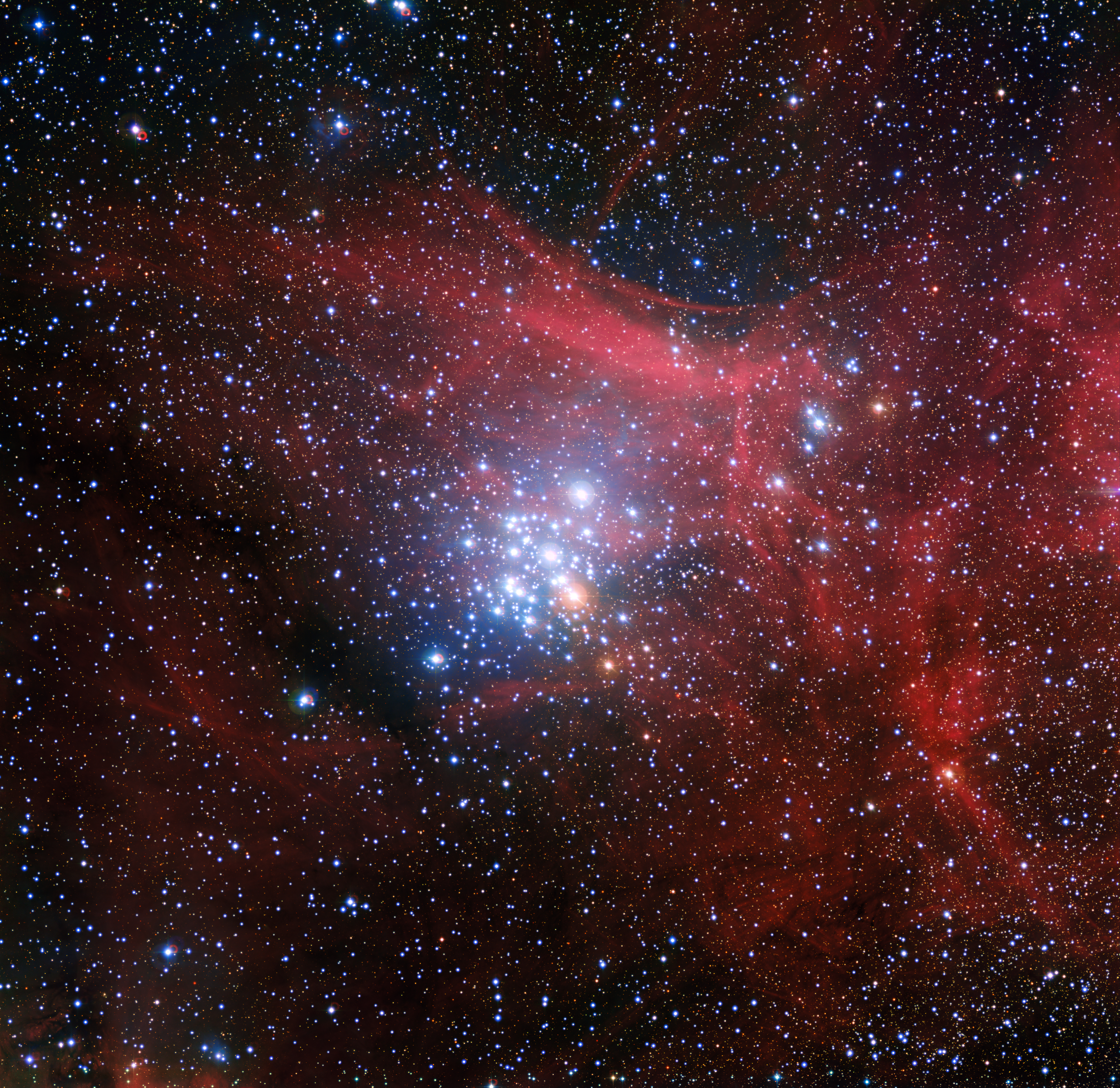
- NGC 3293 taken by the Wide Field Imager on the MPG/ESO 2.2-meter telescope

Observation data (J2000 epoch)
- Right ascension: 10^{h} 35^{m} 24^{s}
- Declination: −58° 14′
- Distance: 8,400 ly (2,590 pc)
- Apparent magnitude (V): 4.7
- Absolute magnitude (V): Unknown
- Apparent dimensions (V): 8.2′

Physical characteristics
- Mass: 1457 M_{☉}
- Radius: 13.2 ly
- Estimated age: 12 ± 3 Myr
- Other designations: Cr 224

Associations
- Constellation: Carina

NGC 3293, also known as the Spider Spit Cluster or the Little Jewel Box, is an open cluster of stars in the Constellation of Carina. It was discovered by Nicolas-Louis de Lacaille in 1751. This cluster consists of more than 100 stars brighter than 14th magnitude in a 10 arc minute field, the brightest of which are blue supergiants of apparent magnitude 6.5 and 6.7. There is also a 7th magnitude pulsating red supergiant, V361 Carinae.

NGC 3293 is associated with the open cluster NGC 3324. Both are fairly young, at around 12 million years old. They show some degree of mass segregation, with more massive stars concentrated near their centers. Neither are dynamically relaxed.
