= European Southern Observatory Catalogue =

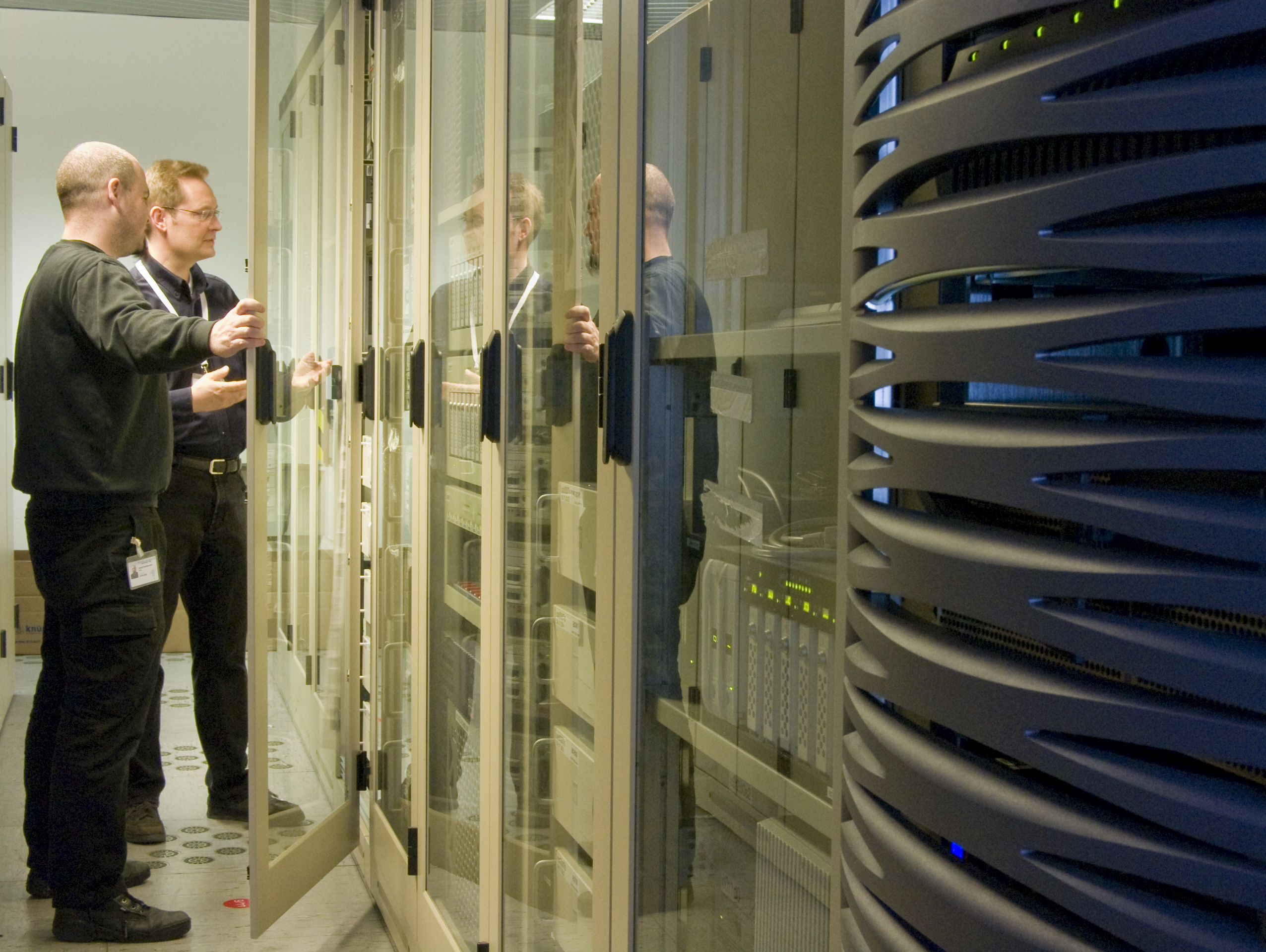
ESO Science Data Archive

The European Southern Observatory Catalogue (or ESO Catalogue) is an astronomical catalogue that contains a log of observations performed with the ESO telescopes at La Silla and Paranal observatories, including the APEX submillimeter telescope on Llano de Chajnantor, as well as the UKIDSS/WFCAM data obtained at the UK Infrared Telescope facility in Hawaii. The observations themselves normally have a proprietary period of one year. After this period the archival data sets can be requested by users worldwide.
