= NGC 456 =

Emission nebula in the constellation Tucana

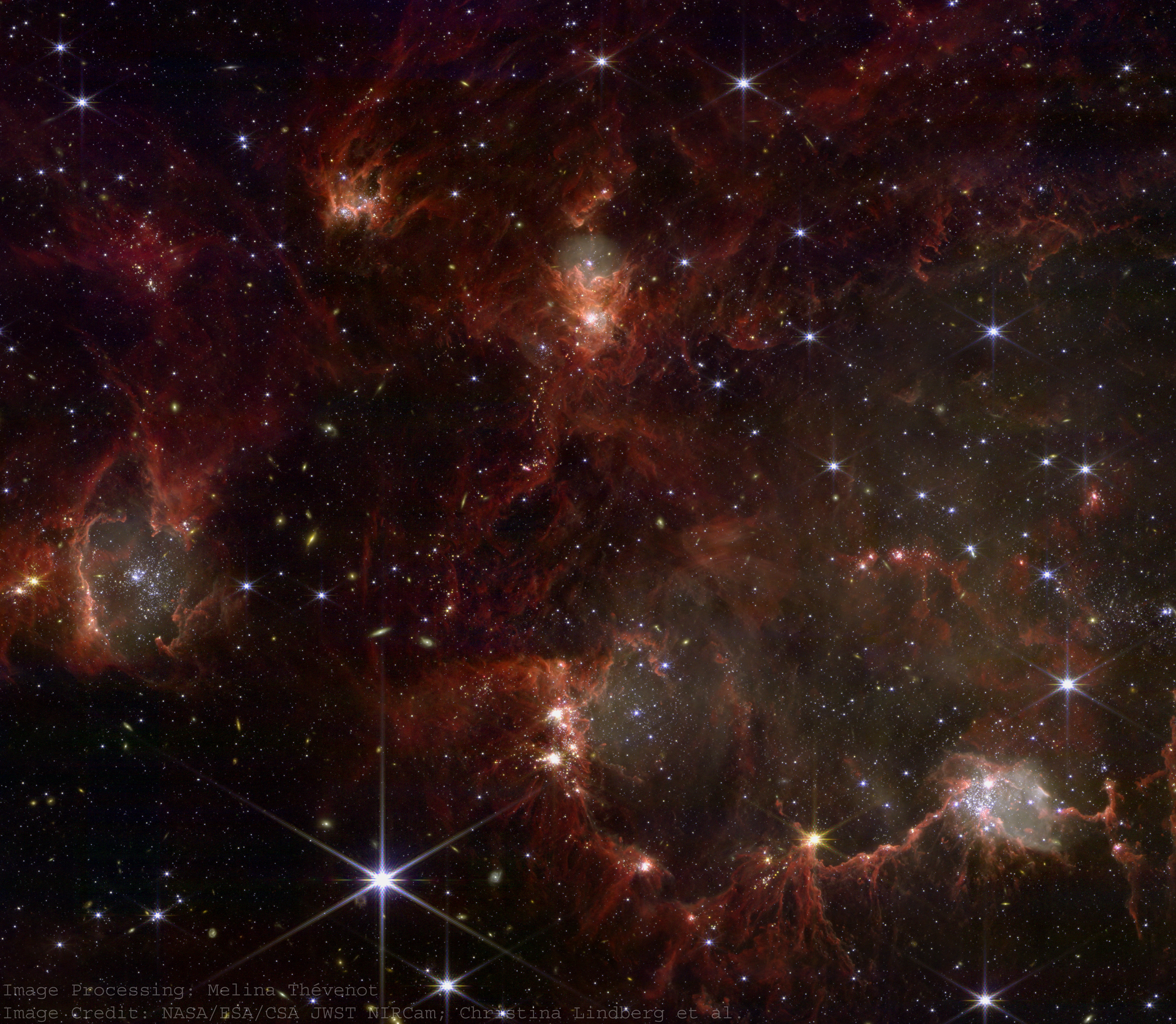
- A detailed view of NGC 456 with JWST NIRCam

Observation data (J2000 epoch)
- Right ascension: 01^{h} 13^{m} 44.4^{s}
- Declination: −73° 17′ 26″
- Apparent dimensions (V): 3.3′ × 2.7′

Physical characteristics
- Other designations: Kron 65, Lindsay 94, DEM-S 147, ESO 29-38, LHA 115-N 83.

Associations
- Constellation: Tucana

NGC 456 is a nebula with an open cluster located in the constellation Tucana. It was discovered on August 1, 1826, by James Dunlop. It was described by Dreyer as "pretty faint, pretty large, irregularly round, mottled but not resolved, 1st of several."

The nebula of NGC 456 is also known as LHA 115-N 83 and often referred as just N83. N83 is located next to N84 (NGC 460) and together they form a molecular cloud complex. N83/N84 is an isolated star-forming region in the southeast part of the Small Magellanic Cloud. The region contains a possible supernova remnant. The N83C region was studied with ALMA. The researchers found peaks associated with young stellar objects. The molecular gas is located at the edges of the HII region.

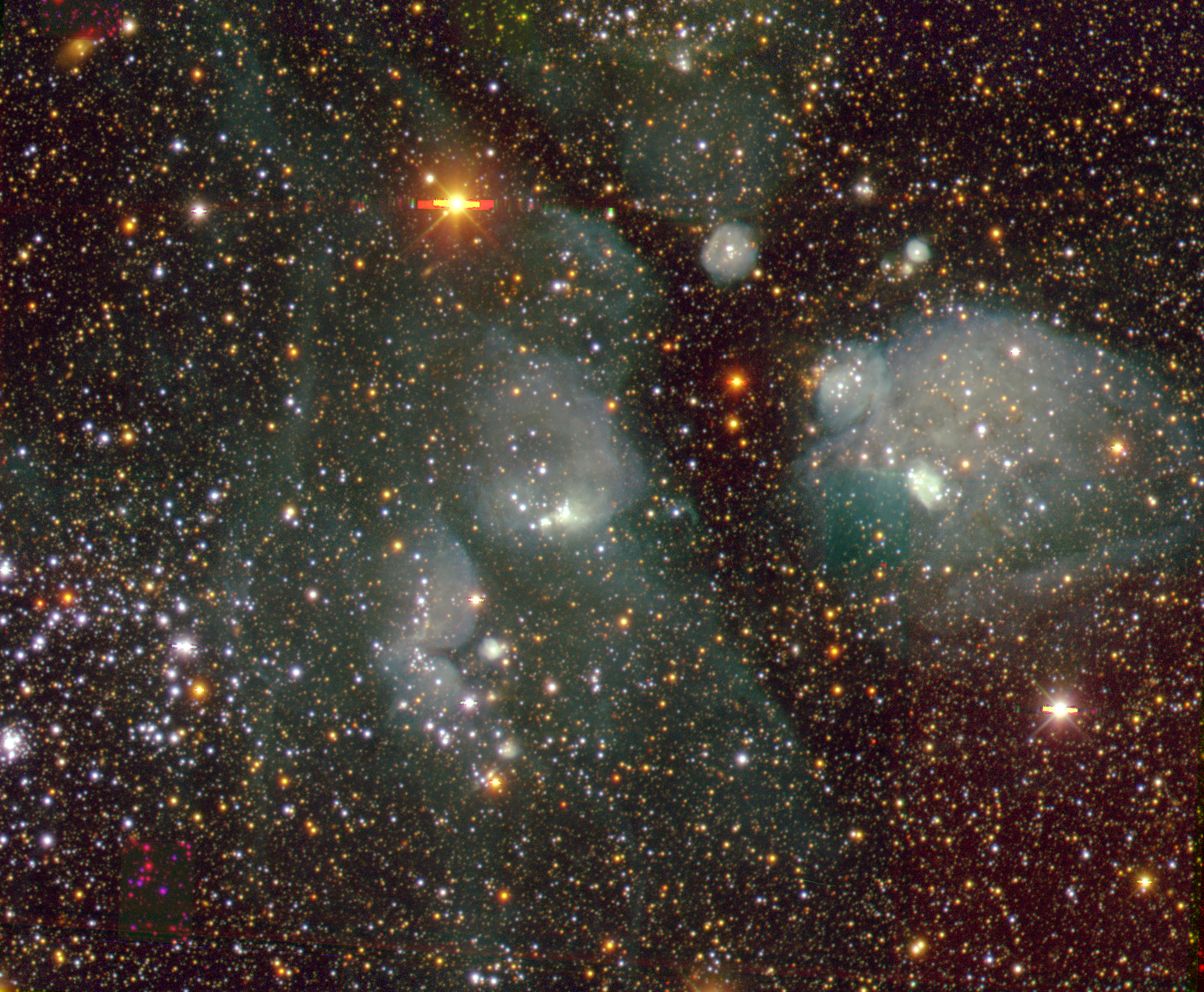
NGC 456 is the nebula on the right. NGC 460 is the nebula in the middle and NGC 465 is the cluster of stars on the left.

== See also ==
- List of NGC objects (1–1000)
