= HD 5980 =

Triple star system in the constellation Tucana

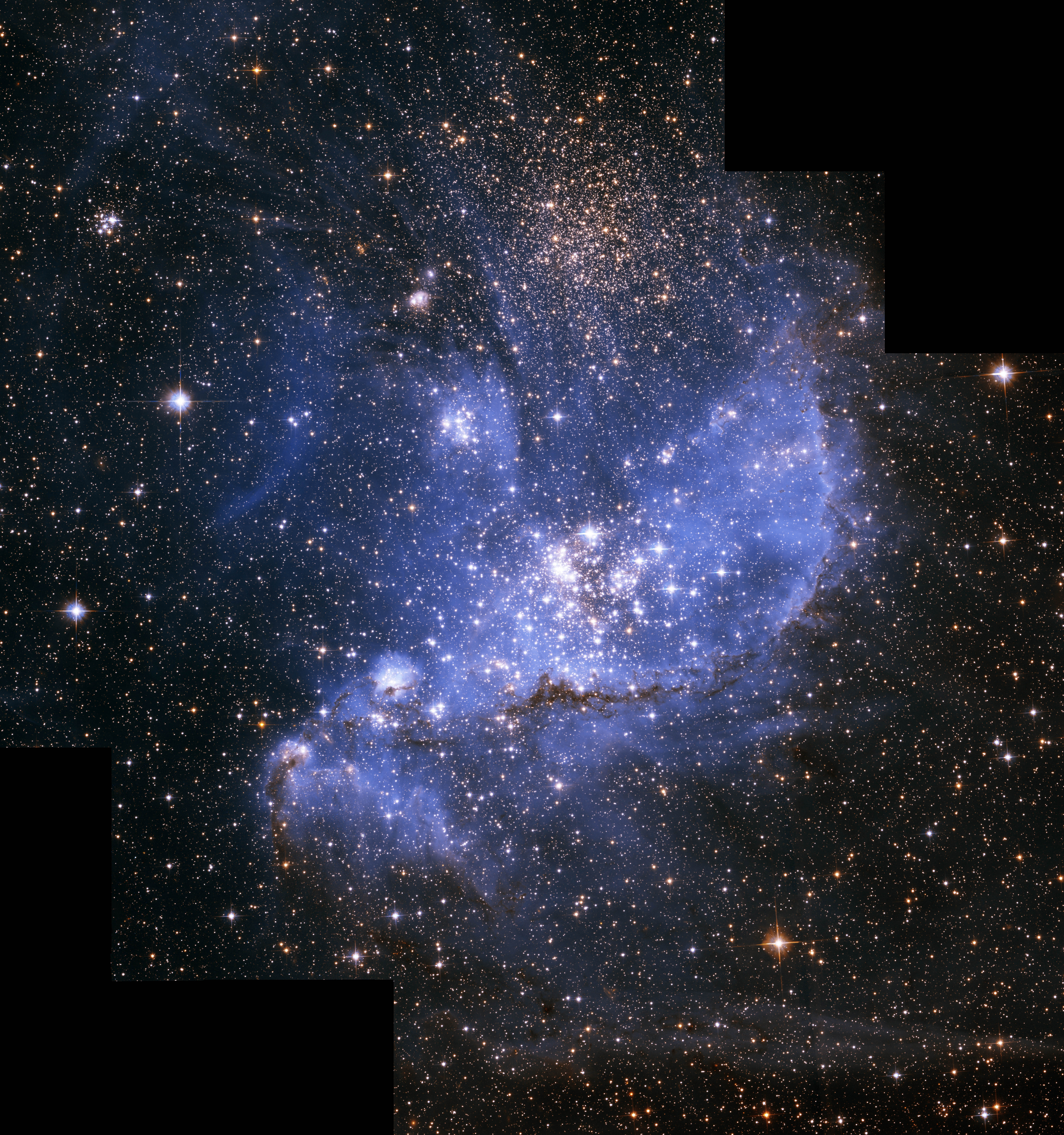
- Location of HD 5980 in (circled in red) in NGC 346

Observation data Epoch J2000 Equinox ICRS
- Constellation: Tucana
- Right ascension: 00^{h} 59^{m} 26.569^{s}
- Declination: −72° 09′ 53.91″
- Apparent magnitude (V): 8.8 - 11.9

Characteristics
- Spectral type: LBV + WN4 + OI
- U−B color index: −0.99
- B−V color index: −0.18
- Variable type: LBV and EA

Astrometry
Radial velocity (R_{v})	−20 km/s
Proper motion (μ)	RA: −3.5 mas/yr Dec.: −2.4 mas/yr
Distance	200,000 ly (64,000 pc)
Absolute magnitude (M_{V})	−8.1 (−7.1/−6.8/−6.7)

Orbit
Primary	HD 5980 A
Secondary	HD 5980 B
Period (P)	19.2656±0.0009 d
Semi-major axis (a)	151±4 R_{☉}
Eccentricity (e)	0.27±0.02
Inclination (i)	86°
Periastron epoch (T)	2,451,424.97±0.25
Argument of periastron (ω) (primary)	134±4°
Semi-amplitude (K_{1}) (primary)	214±6 km/s
Semi-amplitude (K_{2}) (secondary)	200±6 km/s

Orbit
Primary	HD 5980 C
Period (P)	96.56±0.01 d
Eccentricity (e)	0.815
Periastron epoch (T)	2451183.40±0.22
Argument of periastron (ω) (primary)	252±3.3°
Semi-amplitude (K_{2}) (secondary)	81±4 km/s

Details

A
Mass	61 M_{☉}
Radius	24 (21 – 280) R_{☉}
Luminosity	2,200,000 (2,000,000 – 10,000,000) L_{☉}
Temperature	45,000 (21,000 – 53,000) K
Metallicity [Fe/H]	−1.0 dex
Rotational velocity (v sin i)	250 km/s

B
Mass	66 M_{☉}
Radius	22 R_{☉}
Luminosity	1,800,000 L_{☉}
Temperature	45,000 K
Metallicity [Fe/H]	−1.0 dex
Rotational velocity (v sin i)	<400 km/s
Age	2.6 Myr

C
Mass	34 M_{☉}
Radius	24 R_{☉}
Luminosity	708,000 L_{☉}
Temperature	34,000 K
Metallicity [Fe/H]	≅ −0.7 dex
Rotational velocity (v sin i)	120 km/s
Age	3.1 Myr

Other designations
- HD 5980, RMC 14, Sk 78, AB 5, SMC WR5, AAVSO 0056-72

Database references
SIMBAD	data

HD 5980 is a multiple star system on the outskirts of NGC 346 in the Small Magellanic Cloud (SMC) and is one of the brightest stars in the SMC.

HD 5980 has at least three components among the most luminous stars known: the unusual primary has a Wolf–Rayet spectrum and has produced a luminous blue variable (LBV) outburst; the secondary, also a Wolf–Rayet star, forms an eclipsing spectroscopic binary with the primary star; and a more distant O-type supergiant is also likely to be a binary.

== Discovery ==
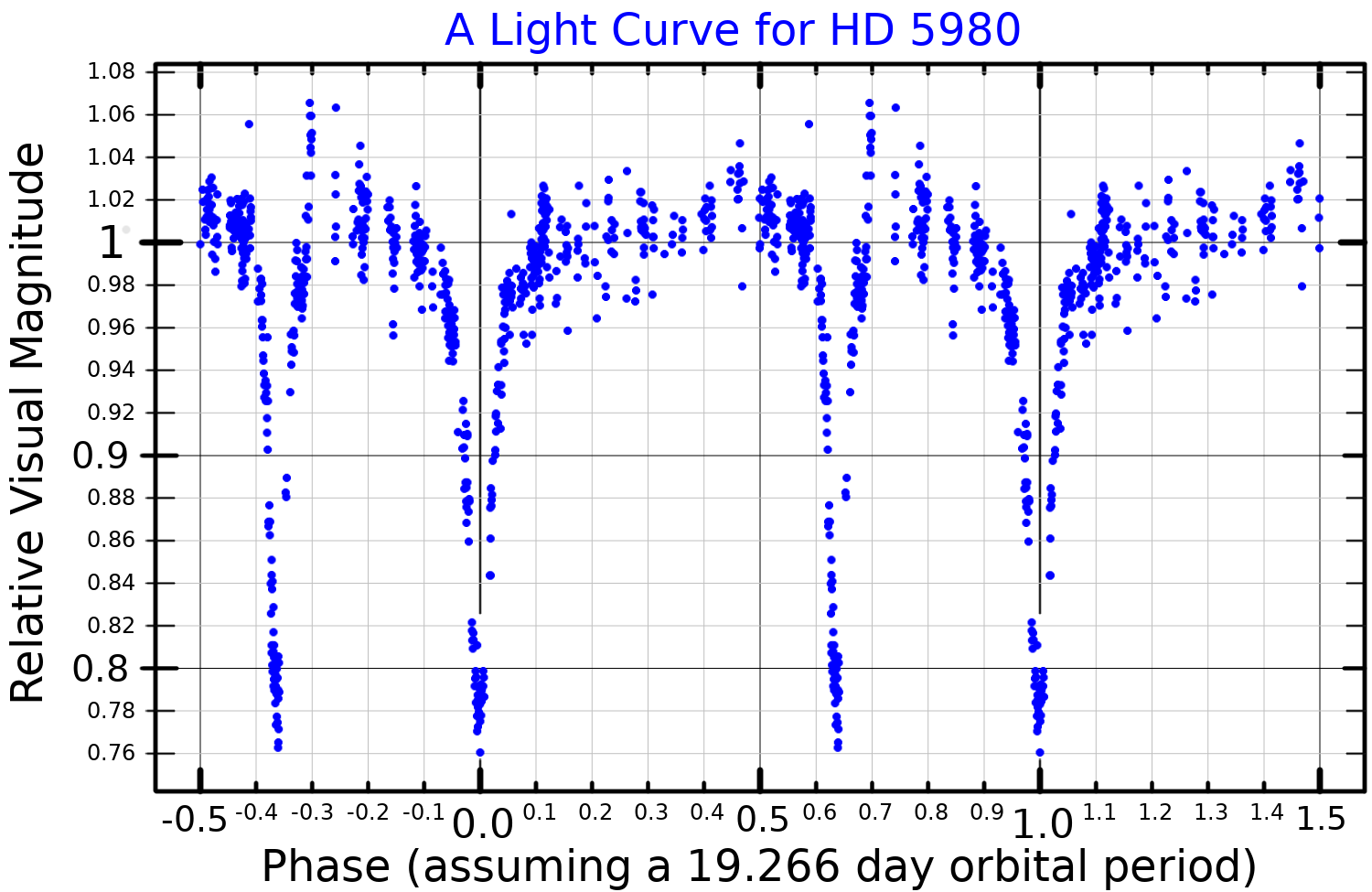
A visual band light curve for HD 5980, adapted from Perrier et al. (2009)

HD 5980 was first recorded in 1901 as the first object in a list of Southern sky objects having peculiar spectra. It was described as "Type V", referring to the Secchi class for stars with emission lines.

It was formally named HD 5980 in the first Henry Draper Catalogue where it was given the spectral type of Oa indicating strong emission bands. The spectral type was later refined to Wa when the emission line "O" stars were recognised as a separate class.

Later observations detected spectral and brightness variations and eclipses, but it was thought to be a simple WR/OB binary. Absorption lines in the spectrum that did not move during the binary orbit eventually led to the conclusion that HD 5980 was a triple system with a close eclipsing binary and a more distant class O supergiant.

In 1993, the spectrum began to change and the brightness increased, beginning a dramatic change that has been interpreted as a unique type of LBV eruption. Since then the star has been intensively observed and modelled.

== Components ==
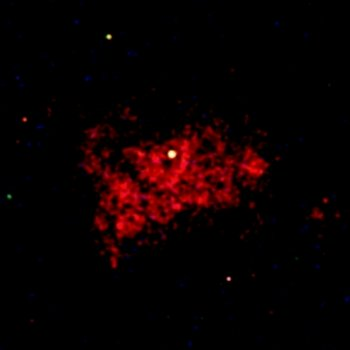
X-ray image by Chandra Observatory

HD 5980 is visually a single star, but the spectrum reveals three hot luminous components. The physical parameters of the three stars are uncertain because of the difficulties of resolving their spectra, the partial eclipses, apparent intrinsic variations with the orbital phase, and the strong variability of at least one component. The calibration of spectral features to physical characters such as temperature has historically been complicated by the low metallicity of objects in the SMC.

The primary star, HD 5980 A, is visually the brightest component of the three. It was apparently a hydrogen-poor WN3-type until about 1990, but then underwent an LBV-type outburst that saw its radius increase ten-fold and its temperature drop dramatically so that it appeared as a B hypergiant with prominent hydrogen spectral lines. Since then it has returned to near its original brightness and temperature. The emission line spectrum is produced in the dense stellar wind and little is known about the underlying photosphere.

The secondary, HD 5980 B, is also a Wolf–Rayet star. It forms a spectroscopic double with the primary A and they orbit each other every 19.3 days. The orbital parameters indicate that the two stars are approximately equally massive, within the margin of error. The orbit is inclined at 86° to us, and partial eclipses occur twice per orbit, with timings that indicate an eccentricity of 0.27. The eclipses only produce a 0.2 magnitude change in the total system brightness, but the shape of the light curve and line profile changes during the eclipses allow both a stellar core and a dense wind region about twice the width of the star to be identified. HD 5980 B is generally classified as WN4. The spectrum can only be distinguished from HD 5980 A on the basis of variations in the profile of some broad emission lines during the orbit. Some hydrogen lines are seen in emission but generally combined with or hidden by other broad emission. Narrow hydrogen absorption lines are not generally considered to originate from this component and do not show the same radial velocity variations.

Component C is a distant hydrogen-rich star identified from narrow absorption lines which do not show the same strong radial velocity variations as the broad emission lines from the A/B pair. Higher resolution spectra show smaller slower radial velocity variations and it is assumed that C itself also has a companion. The primary is a hot conventional star, most likely an early O-type supergiant. A period of 96.5 days has been derived from the radial velocity variations. This is five times the period of the A/B system, suggesting the four stars form a gravitational trapezium system although it cannot be ruled out that it is an unrelated chance alignment.

Pulsations and brightness variations have been interpreted as those of a heartbeat star, probably the A/B pair. This would be the most massive such system. It is also possible that the C/D pair also develops heartbeat pulsations during periastron.

== Luminous blue variable ==
H-R Diagram showing the location of HD 5980A in relation to the S Doradus Instability Strip and a number of more conventional LBVs. The likely location of HD 5980A during its outburst is also shown.

Prior to 1990, HD 5980 had not been observed to show significant variation beyond the regular eclipses. At that time it was known only as a WN+OB binary, but later analysis shows that the primary HD 5980A showed a spectrum similar to a WN3 star. The system had an apparent visual magnitude around 11.7 and the primary is calculated to be slightly the brightest of the three known components.

By November 1993, the spectral type was WN6 and the brightness had increased to around magnitude 10.9. The absorption lines in the spectrum were no longer detectable. The brightness increased for several weeks at the end of 1993, to above 10th magnitude, and the spectral type reached WN8, before the brightness dropped rapidly close to 11th magnitude. In June 1994, the star started to cool and become brighter again. It peaked at magnitude 8.6 in September and was comfortably the brightest star in the SMC, but there are no spectra at this exact time. Very shortly after the peak it was classified as WN11. In November the spectrum was considered to be B1.5Ia^{+}, a blue hypergiant with strong hydrogen and ionised metal lines in emission or with P Cygni profiles. B1.5Ia^{+} is a very similar spectral type to WN11, with lower ionisation levels and stronger P Cygni profile absorption in some lines, indicating a slightly lower temperature with changes to the stellar wind. A month later the brightness had decreased slightly and the spectrum indicated an increase in temperature. Within a year the brightness had dropped to 11th magnitude and the spectrum was back to WN6.

Since the outburst, the brightness has dropped to about magnitude 11.3 and HD 5980 A shows a WN4/5 spectrum. One study suggests an increase of 3–6 times in luminosity to 10,000,000 times that of the Sun (L_{☉}) at its peak, but this may simply be due to different analysis techniques and others find a fairly consistent luminosity of a few million L_{☉}.

An earlier outburst may have occurred around 1960 and a 40-year cycle is proposed. Micro-variations with a 30-minute timescale have also been observed when HD 5980A is in its quiescent phase. The causes of the large-amplitude variations and eruptions are not understood, but it is speculated that the large eruptions are triggered when the star expands sufficiently during a normal LBV outburst to force violent interaction with a close binary companion.

Although HD 5980 is treated as an LBV, it does not follow the normal pattern which would be an effective temperature during outburst of around 8,500K and an A type spectrum. It is speculated that the close companion causes this particular star to exhibit the LBV-type instability at much higher temperatures. Romano's Star and Var 83 may be similar, and the little-studied Var 2 is even hotter, all of them in M33.

== Evolution ==
Small Magellanic Cloud (south is up). NGC 346 the brightest red patch near the centre (the very bright object at the bottom of the frame is NGC 362).

The current evolutionary states and future development of the HD 5980 stars is highly uncertain. The stars cannot be separated visually and their spectra are largely blended so that the exact chemical and physical properties of the stars are subject to wide margins of error. Stars in the Small Magellanic Cloud have low metallicity and this affects the process of stellar evolution, especially for massive stars. Low metallicity reduces mass loss rates. One effect of this is that Wolf–Rayet stars are uncommon, with a higher proportion of massive stars exploding as supernovae before losing enough mass to become a Wolf–Rayet star. Only stars more massive than 45 M_{☉} (or higher) are predicted to become WR stars in the SMC, while in the Milky Way those above 25 M_{☉} do so. Only 12 WR stars are known in the SMC, 11 WN type and 1 WO, all of them massive and luminous compared to Milky Way Wolf–Rayets, and over half have massive companions. SMC WR stars have relatively early spectral types for their temperatures, again as a result of the low metallicity. Other than HD 5980, the latest Wolf–Rayet spectral type in the SMC is WN4. All SMC Wolf–Rayets, with one exception, show some absorption in their spectrum, indicative of an O-type star of similar temperature to the Wolf–Rayet. In some cases, an O companion does exists, but it is speculated that Wolf–Rayet stellar winds are sufficiently weak at SMC metallicities for some photospheric absorption to be seen in the spectrum.

Component C is most likely a relatively normal O-type star. It has been variously classified from O4 to O7, tentatively as a supergiant. Thus it is only slightly evolved from the main sequence, most likely still fusing hydrogen at the core, and may follow a fairly typical single star evolutionary track. Its companion is unknown, but currently too distant to be a strong influence on its evolution.

The current evolutionary state of the WR binary components is less clear. They are in a close orbit but fully detached, although it is possible that mass transfer has taken place in the past when one or other star was expanded. The LBV was estimated to be larger than the orbital separation at the peak of its outburst, although that is effectively just a pseudo-photosphere formed by ejected material. The early WN classification with little hydrogen in the spectrum is generally associated with highly evolved low mass helium burning stars nearing the end of their lives, but the HD 5980 components are massive luminous stars. The spectral types displayed by low metallicity Wolf–Rayet stars such as those in the SMC are not directly comparable to higher-metallicity stars and this complicates interpretation of their evolutionary state. Quasi-chemically homogeneous evolution of very massive stars can approximately reproduce the state of the A and B components as stars just evolving away from the main sequence, but at SMC metallicity this requires near-critical rotation to force sufficient mixing.

There are two binary evolution models that have been developed that reproduce the current system state. In the first model, two stars of initial masses 90 M_{☉} and 80 M_{☉} were evolved with an initial orbital period of 12 days and initial rotation velocity of 500 km/s. After ~3.1 million years, the stars were found to have an orbital period of 19.2d, and masses and luminosity similar to those that are derived from recent observations. No mass transfer has occurred because the stars follow a quasi-chemically evolutionary computation. In the second model, the initial masses of the two stars were 150 M_{☉} and 75 M_{☉} in a 16-day orbit 160 R_{☉} apart. After 2.3 million years, the more massive star starts to overflow its roche lobe and quickly transfers 25 M_{☉} to the smaller star. We observe the system after 2.6 million years. Details of the model are obviously uncertain due to the highly unstable behaviour of the primary observed over the last century.

Wolf–Rayet stars explode as type Ib/c core collapse supernovae when they have fused elements all the way to iron. Depending on the mass of the core at the time of collapse they will leave a black hole or neutron star remnant. SMC Wolf–Rayet stars are expected to be relatively massive and relatively short-lived, leaving behind black holes. They are also good candidates for gamma-ray bursts if they are rotating quickly enough.

== See also ==
- WR 25, a similar star in the Carina Nebula
- List of most massive stars
