= HD 93205 =

Star system in the constellation Carina

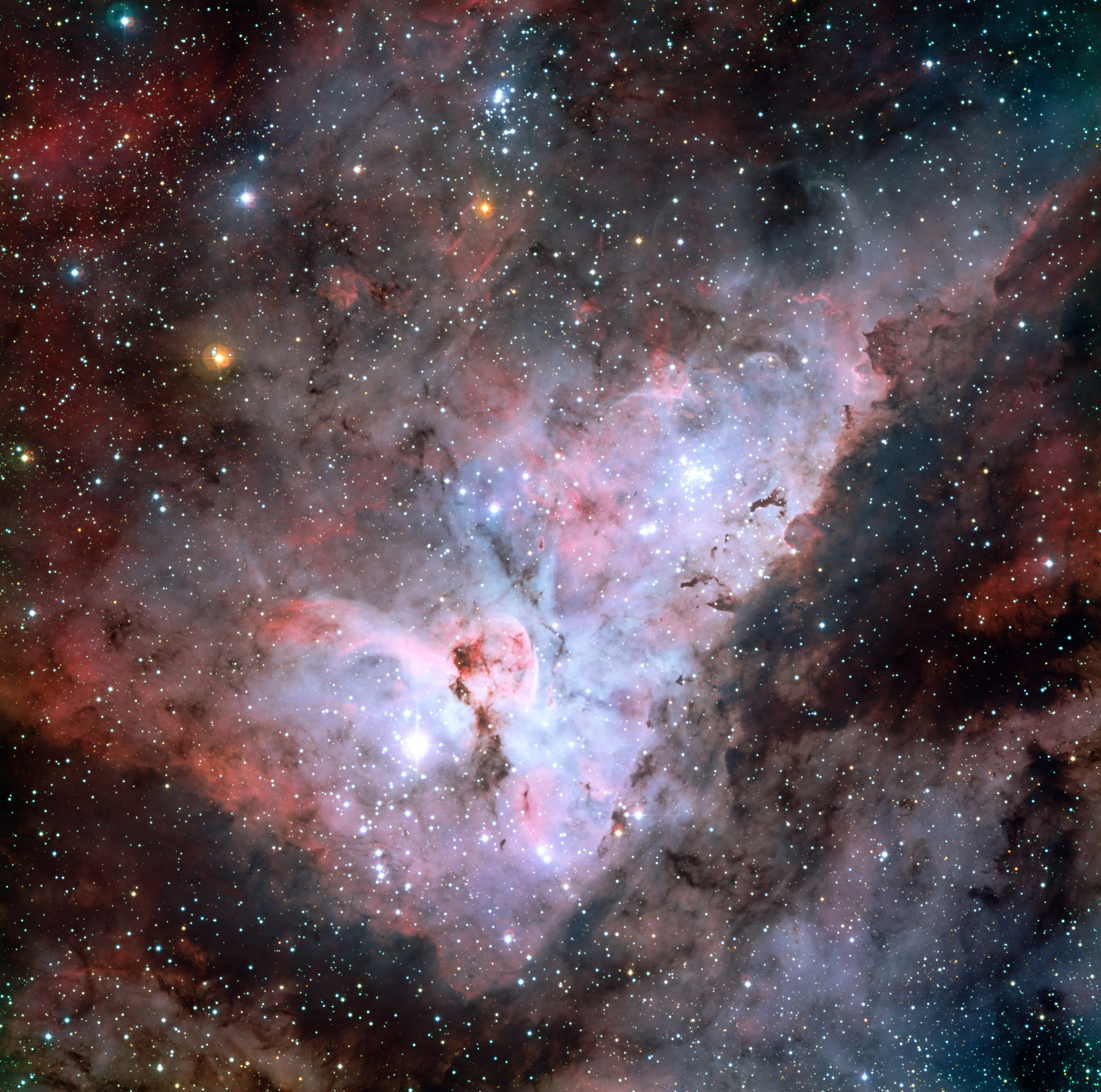
- Location of HD 93205 (circled), southwest of Eta Carinae, the brightest star in the image

Observation data Epoch J2000 Equinox ICRS
- Constellation: Carina
- Right ascension: 10^{h} 44^{m} 33.739^{s}
- Declination: −59° 44′ 15.43″
- Apparent magnitude (V): 7.74 - 7.76

Characteristics
- Evolutionary stage: main sequence
- Spectral type: O3.5Vf + O8V
- U−B color index: −0.91
- B−V color index: +0.05
- Variable type: Ellipsoidal

Astrometry
Radial velocity (R_{v})	3.6 km/s
Proper motion (μ)	RA: −6.619 mas/yr Dec.: 2.947 mas/yr
Parallax (π)	0.4308±0.0248 mas
Distance	7,600 ± 400 ly (2,300 ± 100 pc)
Absolute magnitude (M_{V})	−5.87 + −4.32

Orbit
Period (P)	6.0803 days
Eccentricity (e)	0.370
Inclination (i)	60°
Semi-amplitude (K_{1}) (primary)	132.6 km/s
Semi-amplitude (K_{2}) (secondary)	313.6 km/s

Details
Mass	40 - 60 M_{☉}
Radius	9.2 R_{☉}
Luminosity	1,160,000 L_{☉}
Temperature	51,300 K

secondary
Mass	17 - 25.3 M_{☉}
Radius	7.0 R_{☉}
Luminosity	112,000 L_{☉}
Temperature	38,000 K
Age	< 2 Myr

Other designations
- V560 Car, CD−59°3294, HD 93205, SAO 238418

Database references
SIMBAD	data

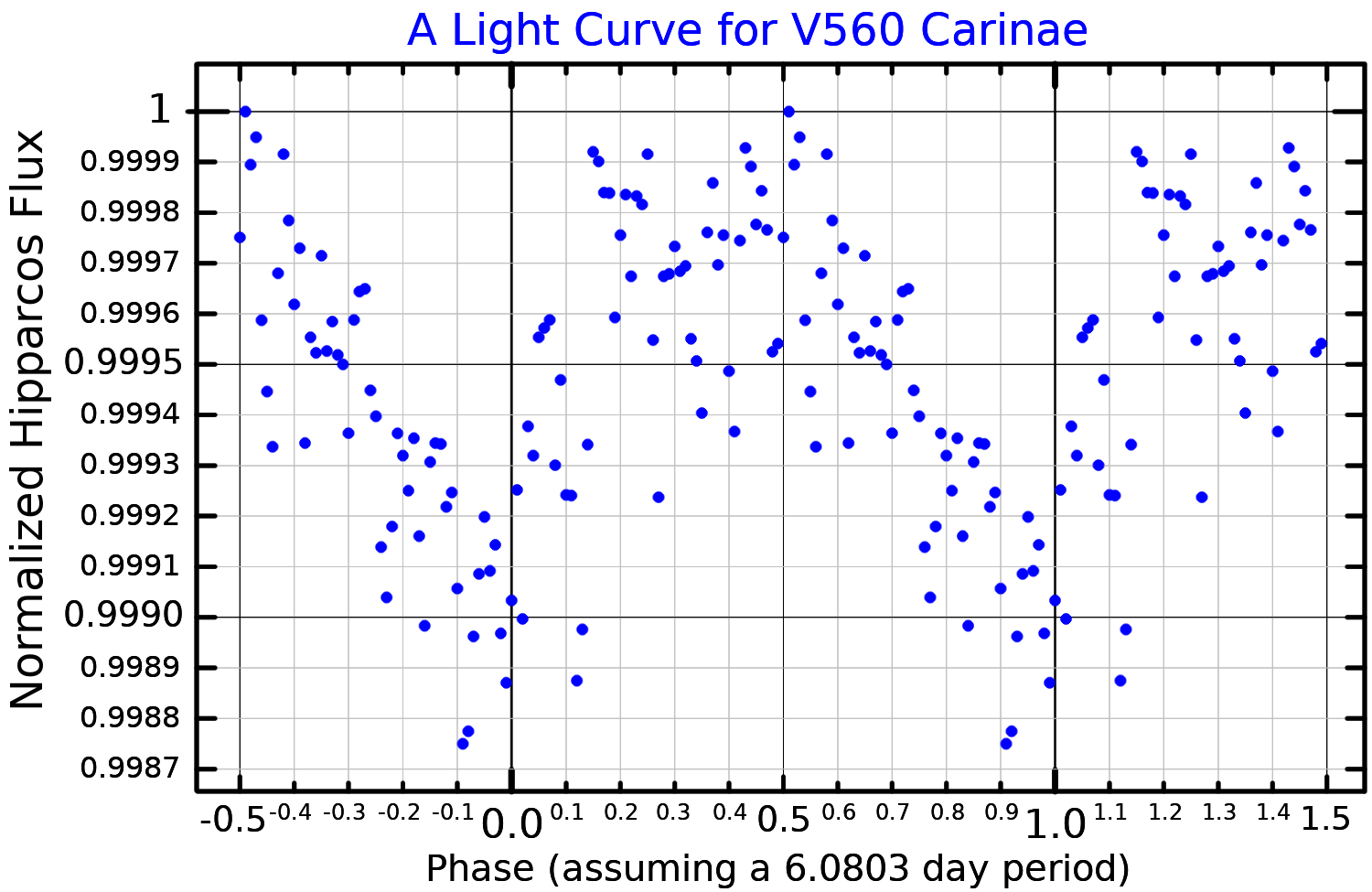
Light curve for V560 Carinae, plotted from Hipparcos data

HD 93205, or V560 Carinae, is a binary stellar system, in the Carina Nebula (NGC 3372) in the constellation Carina. It consists of two massive O-stars that revolve around each other in 6 days.

The more massive member of the pair is an O3.5 main sequence star. The spectrum shows some ionised nitrogen and helium emission lines, indicating some mixing of fusion products to the surface and a strong stellar wind. The mass calculated from apsidal motion of the orbits is 40 to 60 M_{☉}. This is somewhat lower than expected from evolutionary modelling of a star with its observed parameters.

The less massive member is an O8 main sequence star of approximately 20 M_{☉}. It moves in its orbit at a speed of over 300 km/s and is considered to be a relativistic binary, which causes the apses of the orbit to change in a predictable way.

In 1985, Arnout van Genderen et al. reported that the star appeared to be "variable in brightness". Eleonora A. Antokhina et al. confirmed the star's variability in the year 2000, and presented an extensive analysis of the light curve. The star was given its variable star designation, V560 Carinae, in 2001. The closeness of the two stars causes them to become deformed, and this means that the observed brightness of the system varies slightly every six days during its orbit. The total amplitude of the variation is only 0.02 magnitudes.

It is generally considered as a member of the open cluster Trumpler 16. Among its neighbors are some of the most massive and luminous stars in the galaxy, like Eta Carinae, HD 93250 and the binary WR 25. It lies five arc-minutes from Eta Carinae.
