= NGC 265 =

Open star cluster in the constellation Tucana

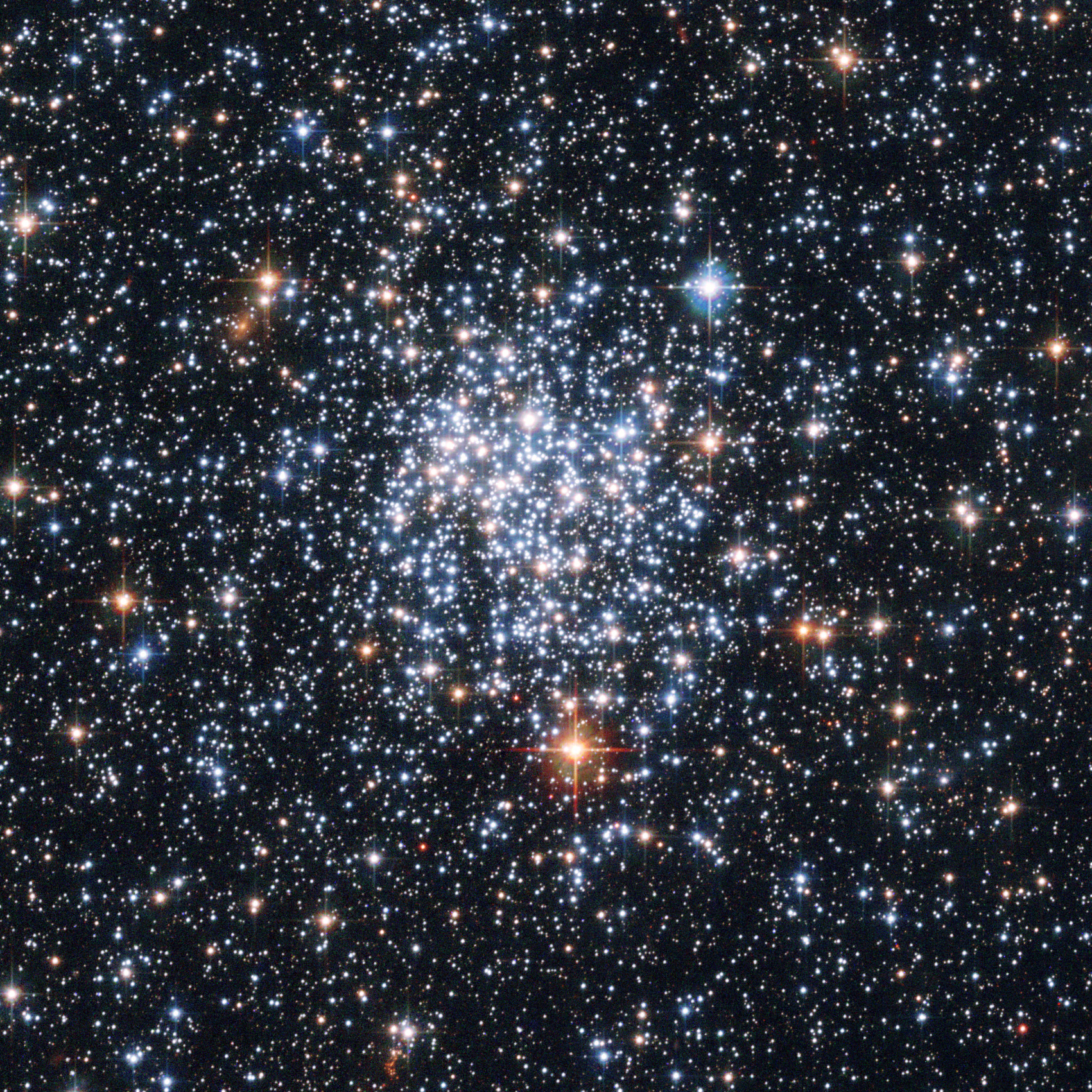
- A Hubble Space Telescope (HST) image of NGC 265. Credit: HST/NASA/ESA.

Observation data (J2000 epoch)
- Right ascension: 00^{h} 47^{m} 35.8^{s}
- Declination: −73° 45′ 11″
- Distance: 200 kly
- Apparent dimensions (V): 0.6′

Physical characteristics
- Mass: 4,200±900 M_{☉}
- Radius: 47 ly (14.5 pc)
- Estimated age: 250±120 Myr
- Other designations: Cl Lindsay 34, ESO 29-14, SMC−OGLE 39

Associations
- Constellation: Tucana

NGC 265 is an open cluster of stars in the southern constellation of Tucana. It is located in the Small Magellanic Cloud, a nearby dwarf galaxy. The cluster was discovered by English astronomer John Herschel on April 11, 1834. J. L. E. Dreyer described it as, "faint, pretty small, round", and added it as the 265th entry in his New General Catalogue.

This cluster has an angular core radius of 18″ and a physical radius of approximately 47 ly. It has a combined 4,200 times the mass of the Sun and is around 250 million years old. The metallicity of the cluster – what astronomers term the abundance of elements with higher atomic number than helium – is at around −0.62, or only 24% of that in the Sun. The turn-off mass for the cluster, when a star of that mass begins to evolve off the main sequence into a giant, is about 4.0 to 4.5 M_{☉}.

== See also ==
- NGC 290
