= NGC 460 =

Open cluster in the constellation Tucana

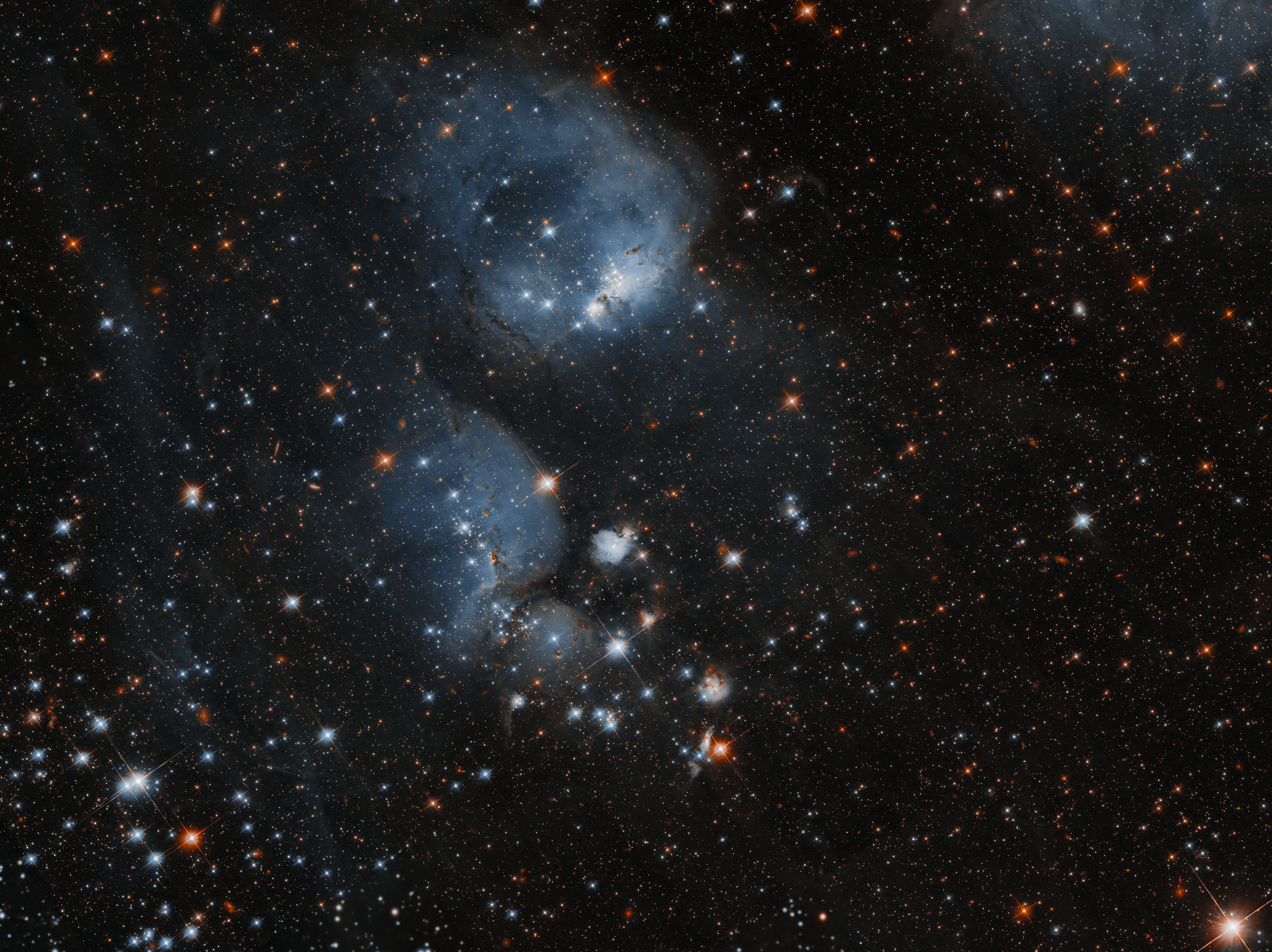
- NGC 460 imaged by the Hubble Space Telescope

Observation data (J2000 epoch)
- Right ascension: 01^{h} 14^{m} 41.6^{s}
- Declination: −73° 17′ 51″

Physical characteristics
- Other designations: Kron 66, Lindsay 97, IRAS 01133-7333, LI-SMC 201.

Associations
- Constellation: Tucana

NGC 460 is an open cluster with a nebula located in the constellation Tucana. It was possibly observed on August 1, 1826, by James Dunlop, though it was officially discovered on April 11, 1834, by John Herschel. Dreyer described it as "very faint (in Nubecular Minor)," with Nubecular Minor referring to the Small Magellanic Cloud. DeLisle Stewart described it as "faint, pretty large, irregularly round, gradually brighter middle, mottled but not resolved, 2nd of several."

== Image gallery ==
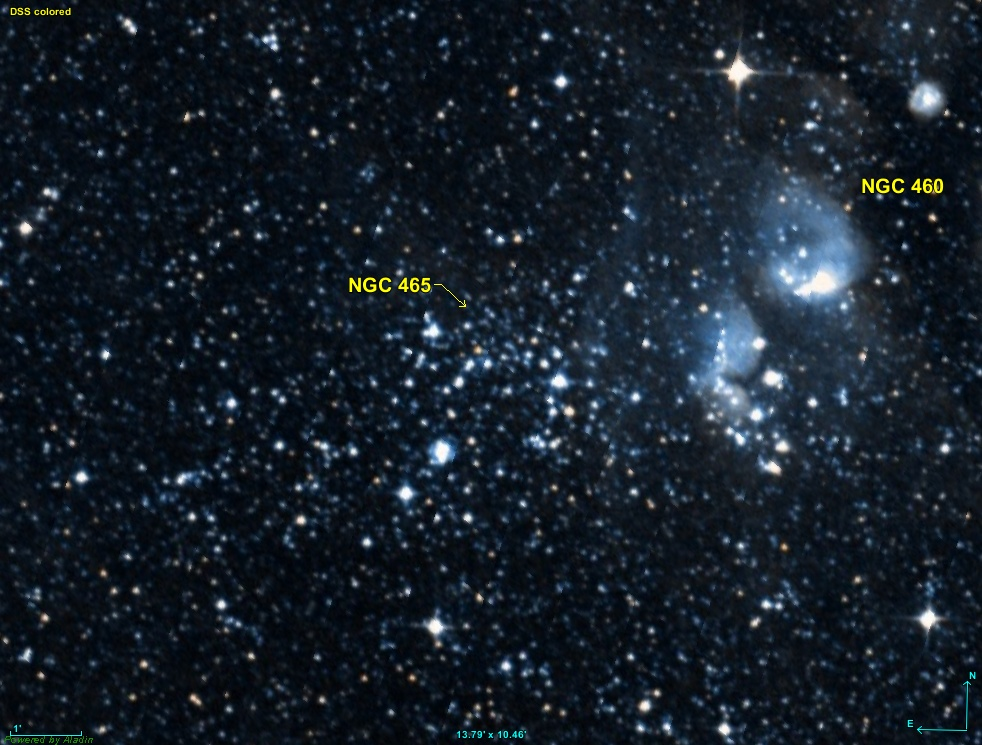
NGC 465 and NGC 460 imaged by DSS

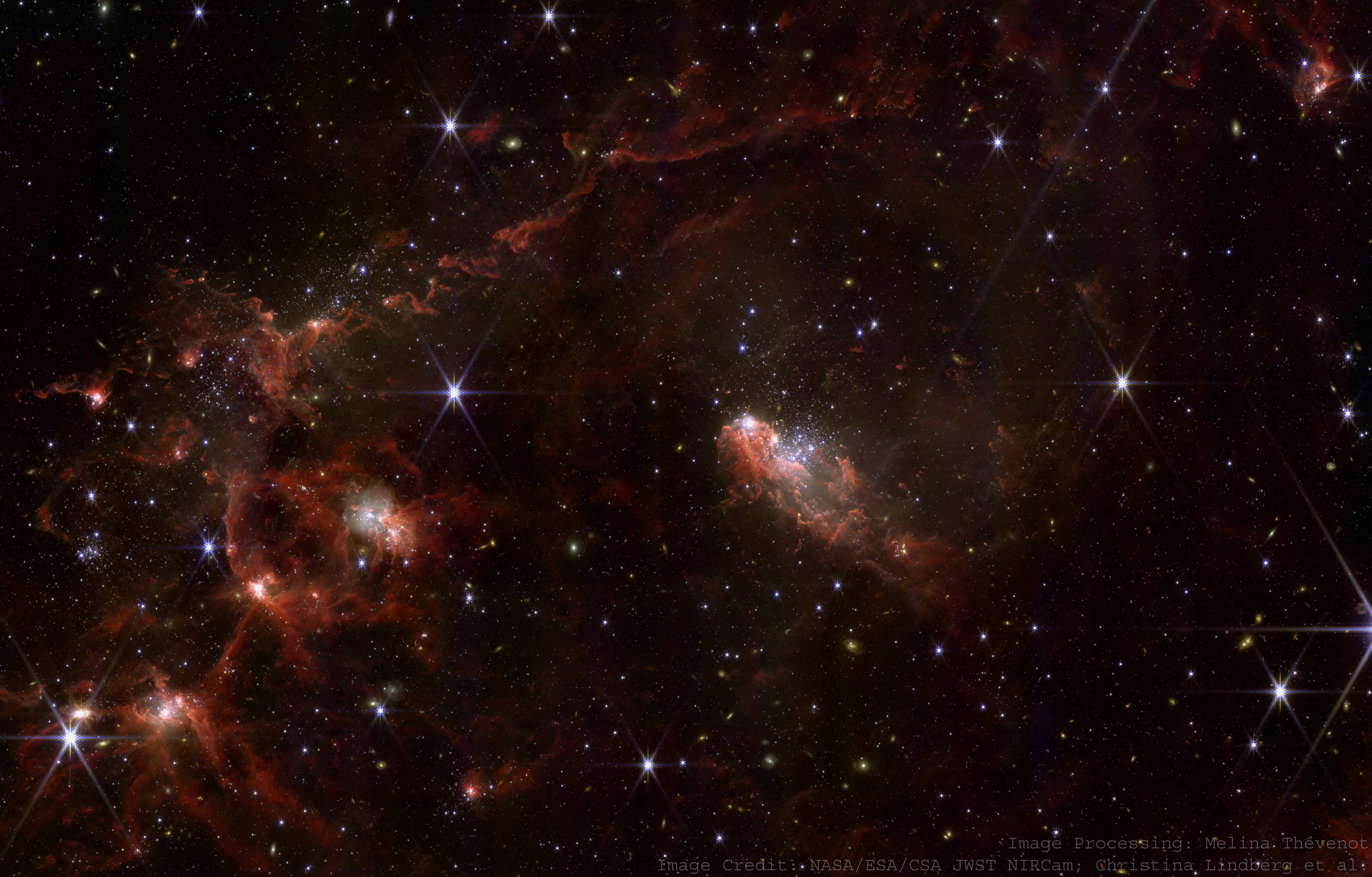
Detailed view of NGC 460 with JWST NIRCam

== See also ==
- List of NGC objects (1–1000)
