= Trumpler 16 =

Massive open cluster in the constellation Carina

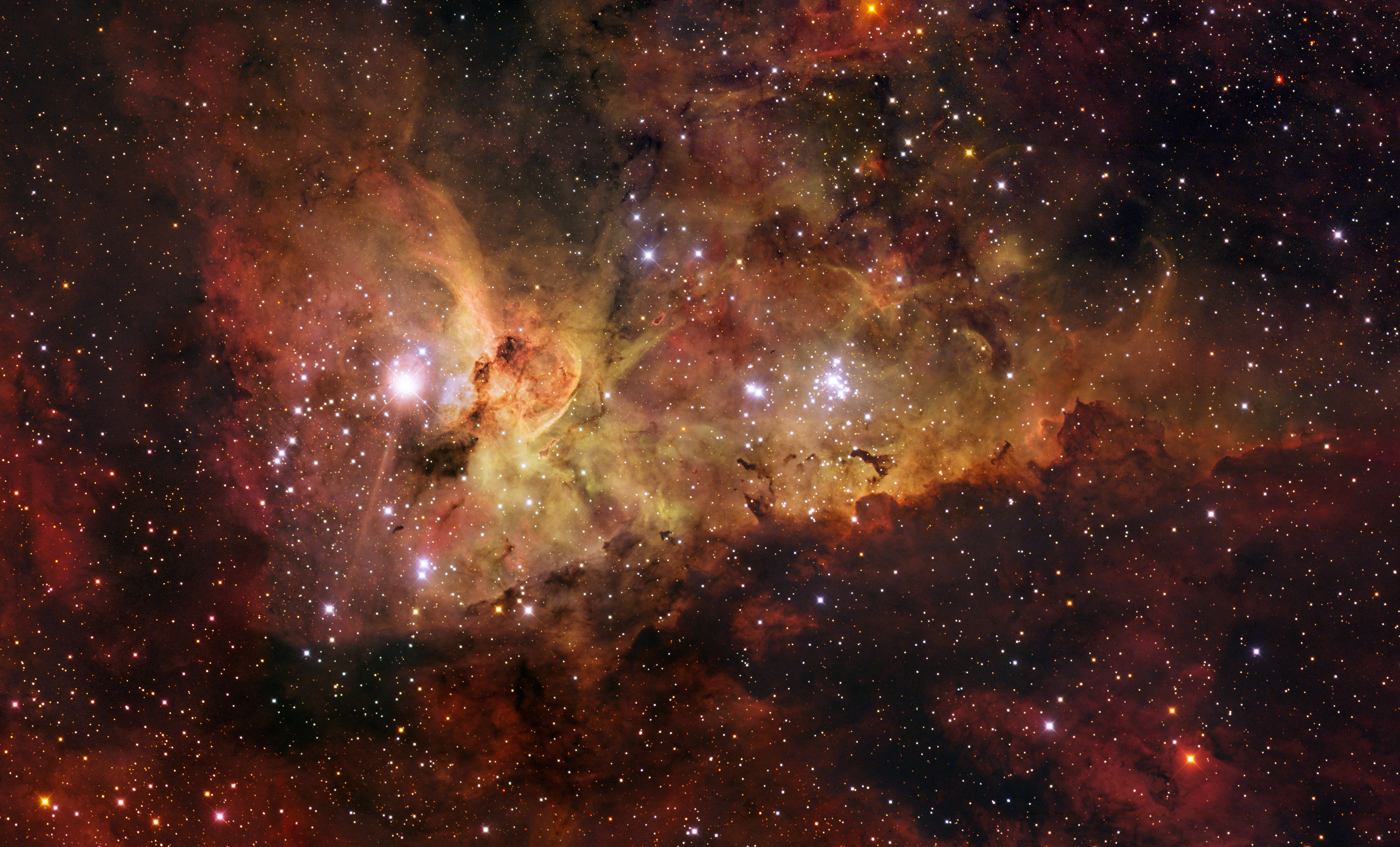
- The inner region of the Carina Nebula as seen in near-infrared. Trumpler 16 is the cluster of stars at the left, around Eta Carinae (the brightest star in the image).

Observation data (J2000 epoch)
- Right ascension: 10^{h} 45^{m} 10^{s}
- Declination: −59° 43′ 00″
- Distance: 9,270 ly (2,842 pc)
- Apparent magnitude (V): 5.0

Physical characteristics
- Other designations: Cr 234, C 1043-594, Cl VDBH 105, OCl 829.0, [KPR2004b] 265, [KPS2012] MWSC 1850

Associations
- Constellation: Carina

Trumpler 16 (Tr 16) is a massive open cluster that is home to some of the most luminous stars in the Milky Way galaxy. It is situated within the Carina Nebula complex in the Carina–Sagittarius Arm, located approximately 9,270 ly (2,842 pc) from Earth. The cluster has one star visible to the naked eye from the tropics southward, Eta Carinae.

== Description ==
Its most luminous members are Eta Carinae and WR 25, with both having luminosities several million times that of the Sun, and there are three other extreme stars with O3 spectral classes. Both Eta Carinae and WR 25 are binaries, with the primary stars contributing most of the luminosity, but with companions which are themselves more massive and luminous than most stars. Totalling all wavelengths, Eta Carinae is estimated to be the more luminous of the two, 4,600,000 times the Sun's luminosity (absolute bolometric magnitude −12) compared to WR 25 at 2,400,000 times the Sun's luminosity (absolute bolometric magnitude −11.2). However, Eta Carinae appears by far the brightest object, both because it is brighter in visual wavelengths and because it is embedded in nebulosity which exaggerates the luminosity. WR 25 is very hot and emits most of its radiation at ultraviolet wavelengths.

Prominent stars
Star name	MJ number	Effective temperature (K)	Absolute magnitude	Bolometric magnitude	Mass (M_{☉})	Spectral type	Ref.
η Car (HD 93308)		35200+37200	−8.6	−12	100+30	LBV+O	
WR 25 (HD 93162)	245	50100	−6.98	−11.2	98	O2.5If*/WN6+OB	
HD 93250	383	46000	−6.14	−10.5	83	O4IV(fc)	
V560 Car (HD 93205)	342	51300+38000	−5.87 + −4.32	−10.4 + −7.9	40+17	O3.5Vf+O8V	
HD 303308	480	51300	−5.9	−10.4	93	O3V	
HD 93204	340	46100	−5.4	−9.6	59	O5V	
CPD-59 2600	380	43600	−5.5	−9.6	55	O6V	
CPD-59 2641	535	43600	−5.2	−9.3	49	O6V	
ALS 15210	257	47800	−4.3	−8.7	44	O4I	
CPD-59 2603	408	41000	−5.2	−9.1	43	O7V	
CPD-59 2636	517	38500	−5.2	−8.9	37	O8V	
CPD-59 2626	484	41000	−4.8	−8.7	37	O7V	
HD 93343	512	41000	−4.7	−8.6	37	O7V	
V731 Car (CPD-59 2635)	516	37200	−5	−8.6	33	O8.5V	
CPD-59 2591	359	38500	−4	−7.7	27	O8V	
HD 305518	117	34700	−4.8	−8.2	27	O9.5V	

== Carina OB1 ==
Trumpler 16 and Trumpler 14 are the most prominent star clusters in Carina OB1, a giant stellar association in the Carina spiral arm. Another cluster within Carina OB1, Collinder 228, is thought to be an extension of Trumpler 16 appearing visually separated only because of an intervening dust lane. The spectral types of the stars indicate that Trumpler 16 formed by a single wave of star formation. Because of the extreme luminosity of the stars formed, their stellar winds push away the clouds of dust, similar to the Pleiades. In a few million years, after the brightest stars have exploded as supernovae, the cluster will slowly die away. Trumpler 16 includes most of the stars in the eastern portion of the Carina OB1 association.

== Gaia Data Release 2 ==
Gaia Data Release 2 provides parallaxes for many stars considered to be members of Trumpler 16. It finds that the four hottest O-class stars in the region have very similar parallaxes with a mean value of 0.383±0.017 mas. Many of the other supposed members show significantly different parallaxes and may be foreground or background objects. Therefore, the distance of Trumpler 16 is assumed to be around 2,600 pc, significantly further than the accurately-known distance of η Carinae.

== Gallery ==
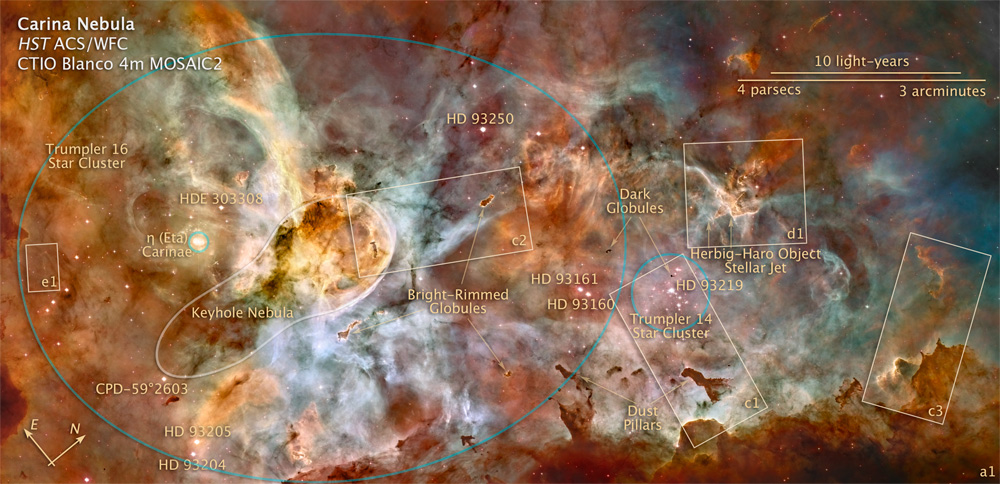
Carina OB1 association, with the area of Trumpler 16 indicated

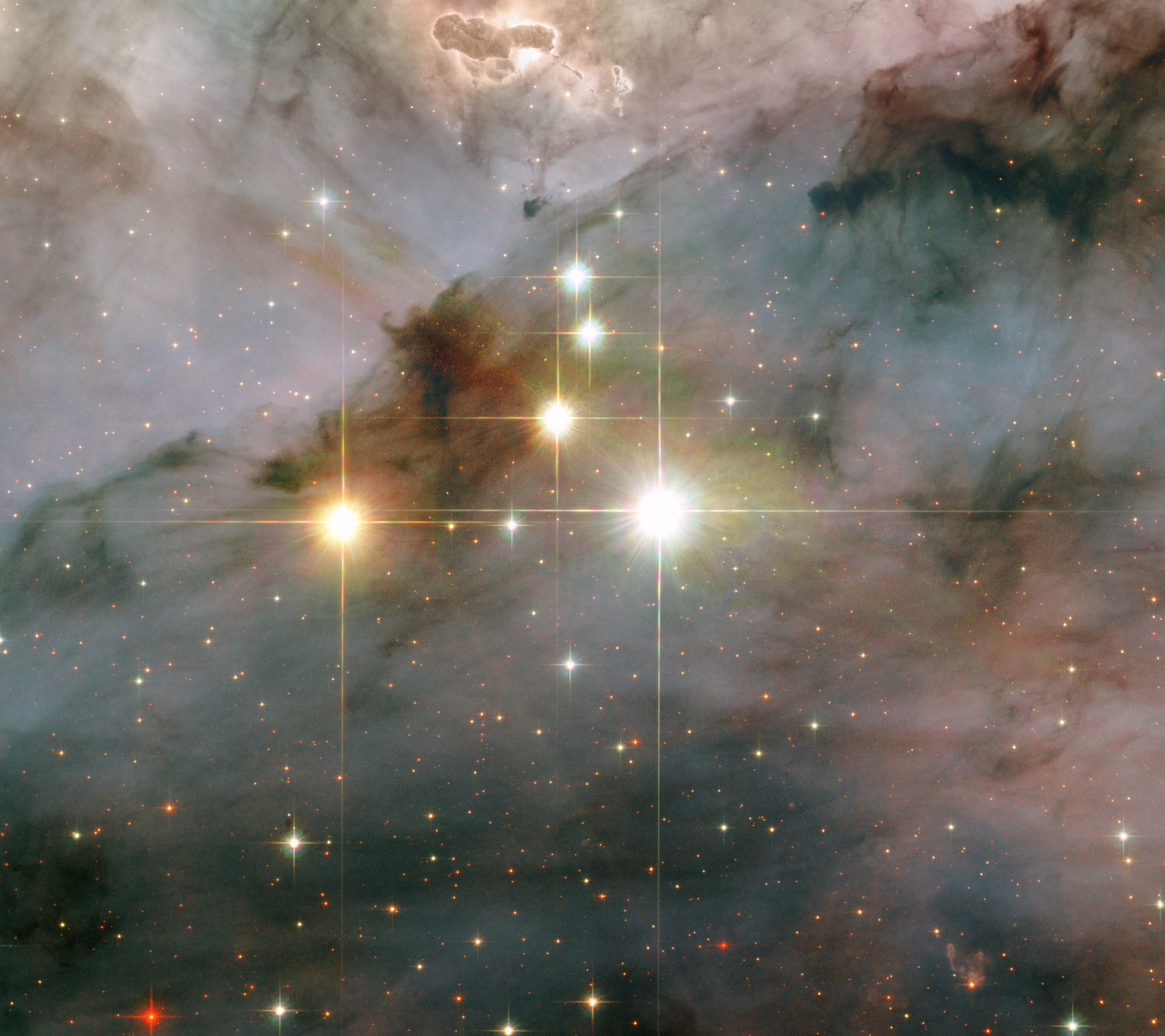
Some of the stars in Tr 16: WR 25 and ALS 15210 are the brightest and third-brightest respectively in this image, the second-brightest is merely a foreground object.

== See also ==
- List of most massive stars
