= NGC 290 =

Open cluster in the constellation Tucana

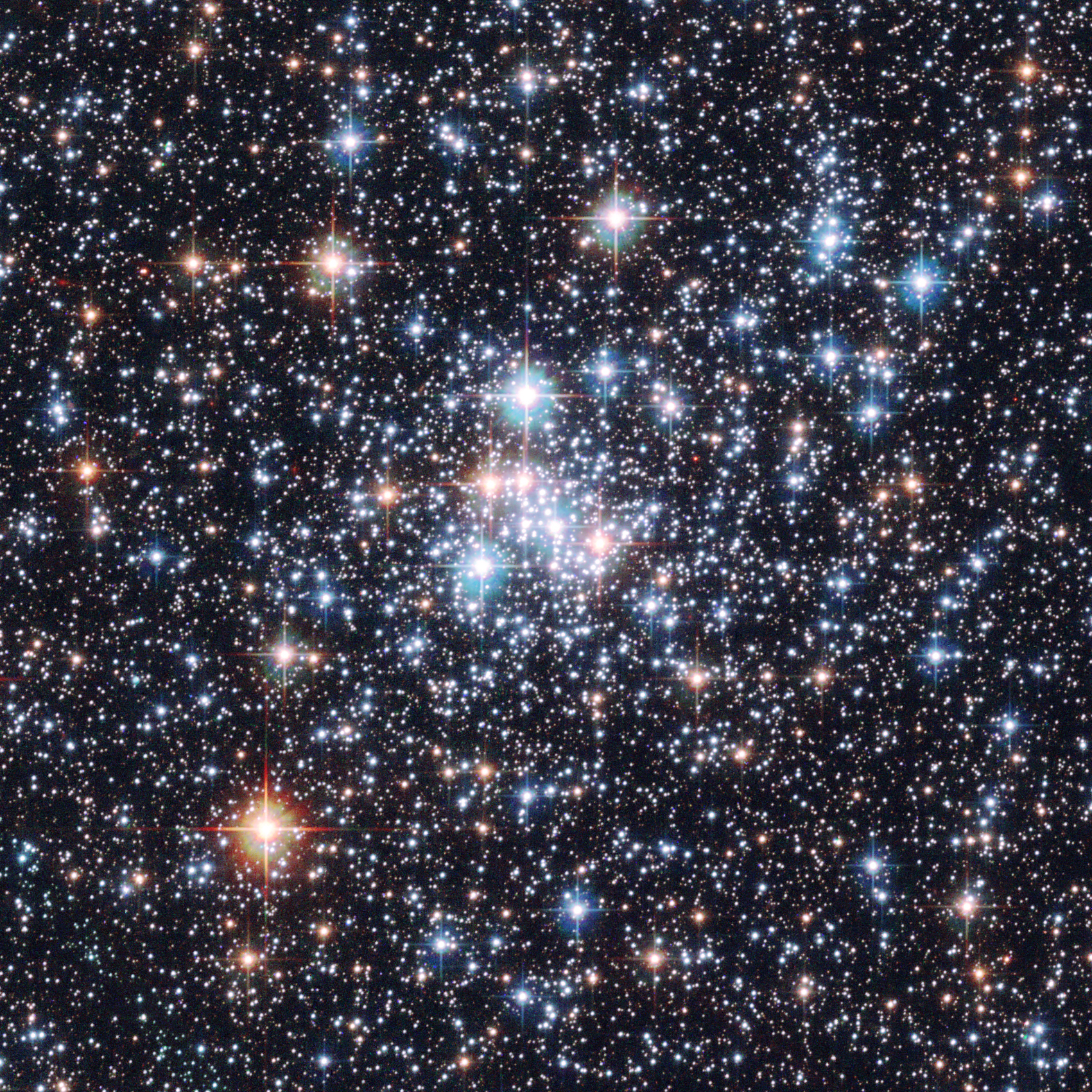
- NGC 290 imaged by the Hubble Space Telescope; Credit: HST/NASA/ESA.

Observation data (J2000 epoch)
- Right ascension: 00^{h} 51^{m} 12.33^{s}
- Declination: −73° 09′ 42.1″
- Distance: 200 kly (61 kpc)
- Apparent magnitude (V): 11.71

Physical characteristics
- Mass: 5.8×10^{3} M_{☉}
- Radius: ~33 ly (10 pc)
- Estimated age: 63 Myr; 30±10 Myr
- Other designations: Cl Lindsay 42, ESO 029–19, OGLE-CL SMC 69

Associations
- Constellation: Tucana

NGC 290 is an open cluster of stars in the southern constellation of Tucana. This cluster was discovered September 5, 1826, by Scottish astronomer James Dunlop. It lies some 200,000 light years away from the Sun in the Small Magellanic Cloud galaxy. The cluster is an estimated 30–63 million years old and is around 65 light years across.

== See also ==
- NGC 265
- List of NGC objects (1–1000)
