= NGC 376 =

Globular cluster in the constellation Tucana

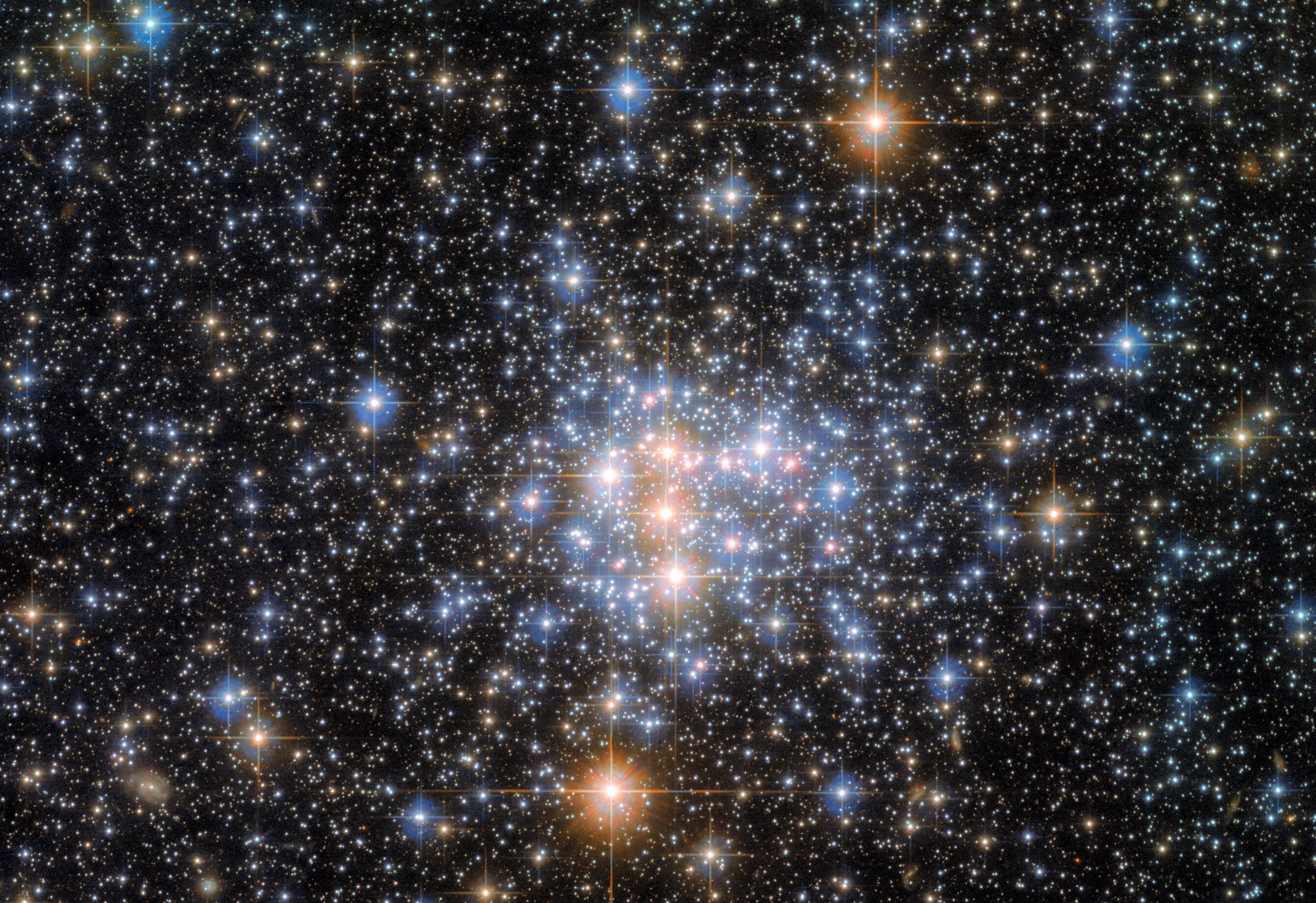
- Hubble Space Telescope image of NGC 376

Observation data (J2000 epoch)
- Right ascension: 01^{h} 03^{m} 50.21^{s}
- Declination: −72° 49′ 33.5″
- Apparent magnitude (V): 10.90

Physical characteristics
- Mass: 3,400±400 M_{☉}
- Estimated age: 28±7 Myr
- Other designations: ESO 029-SC 029.

Associations
- Constellation: Tucana

NGC 376 is a young open cluster of stars in the southern constellation of Tucana. It was discovered on September 2, 1826, by Scottish astronomer James Dunlop. Dreyer, a Danish/British astronomer, described it as a "globular cluster, bright, small, round." It is irregular in form, with a central spike.

The cluster is located in the eastern extension of the Small Magellanic Cloud (SMC), a nearby dwarf galaxy. It may have already lost 90% of its original mass and is in the process of dissolving into the SMC. As a result, it has achieved a relatively low concentration of stars and is no longer in dynamic equilibrium. The cluster is about 28 million years old and contains ~3,400 times the mass of the Sun. It has a core radius of 7.6 ± 0.3 ly and a tidal radius of 19.2 ± 0.7 ly.
