= NGC 346 =

Open cluster in the constellation Tucana

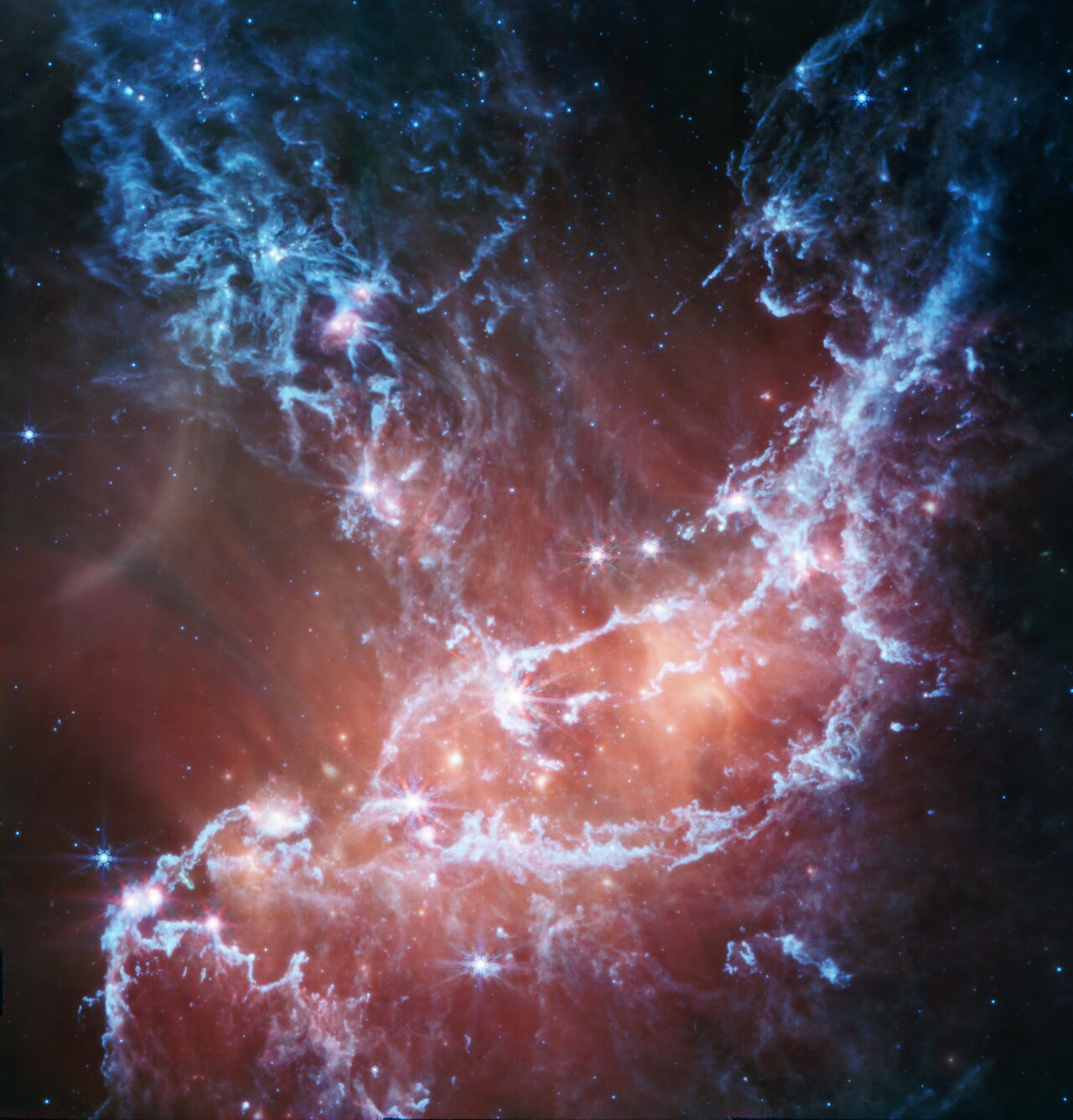
- James Webb Space Telescope image of NGC 346

Observation data (J2000 epoch)
- Right ascension: 00^{h} 59^{m} 05.090^{s}
- Declination: −72° 10′ 33.24″
- Distance: 210,000 light-years

Physical characteristics
- H II region
- Other designations: ESO 51-10, N66

Associations
- Constellation: Tucana

NGC 346 is a young open cluster of stars with associated nebula located in the Small Magellanic Cloud (SMC) that appears in the southern constellation of Tucana. It was discovered August 1, 1826 by Scottish astronomer James Dunlop. J. L. E. Dreyer described it as, "bright, large, very irregular figure, much brighter middle similar to double star, mottled but not resolved". On the outskirts of the cluster is the multiple star system HD 5980, one of the brightest stars in the SMC.

== Description ==
This cluster is located near the center of the brightest H II region in the SMC, designated N66. This is positioned in the northeast section of the galactic bar. Stellar surveys have identified 230 massive OB stars in the direction of this cluster. 33 of the cluster members are O-type stars, with 11 of type O6.5 or earlier. The inner 15 pc radius of the cluster appears centrally condensed, while the area outside that volume is more dispersed. The youngest cluster members near the center have ages of less than two million years, and observations suggests the cluster is still engaged in high mass star formation. The cluster star formation rate is estimated at (4±1)×10^{−3} M_{☉} yr^{−1}.

== Image Gallery ==
Image of NGC 346 with a 30 arcminute wide field of view showing the wispy nebular structure around it.

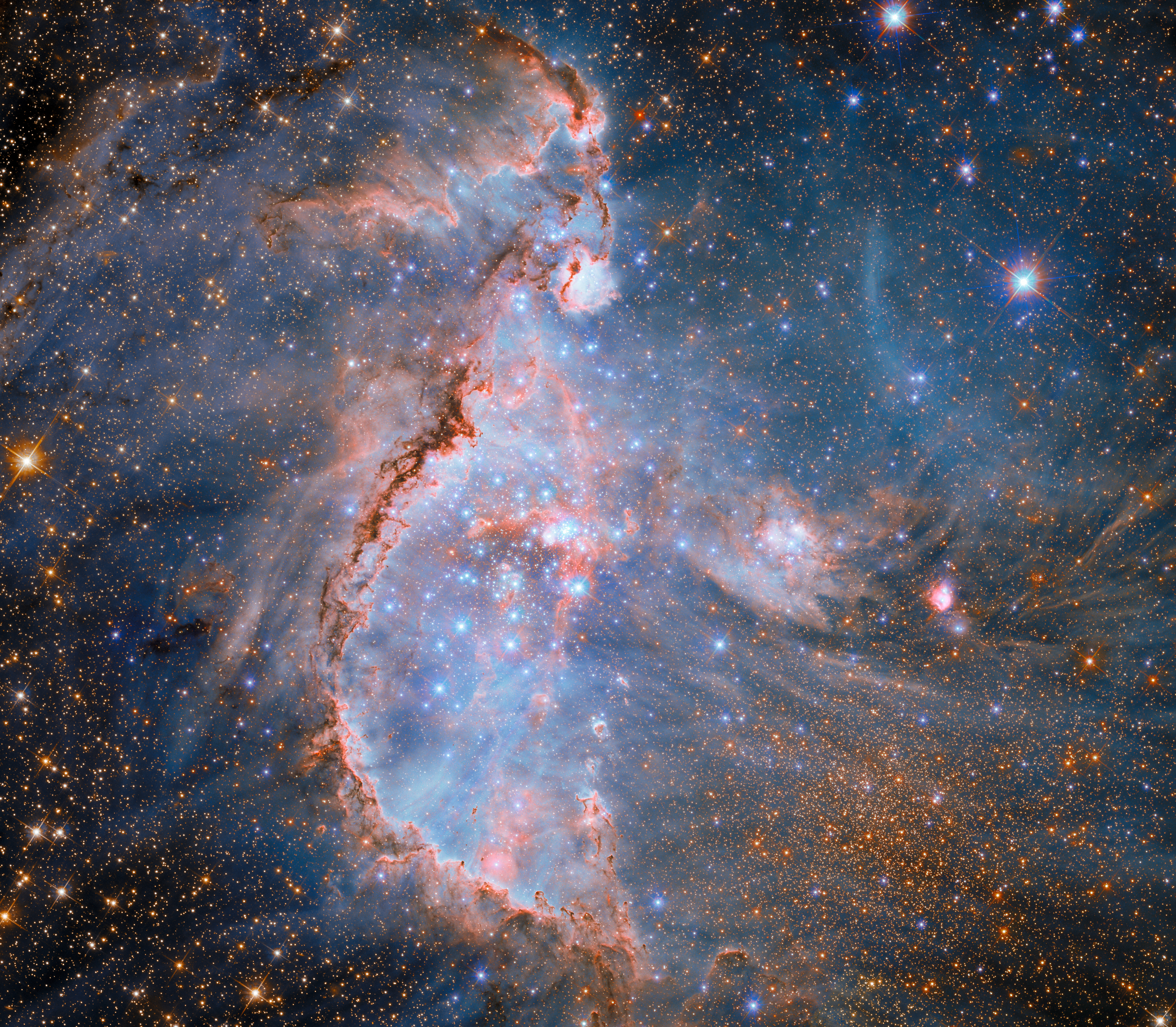
NGC 346 imaged by the Hubble Space Telescope

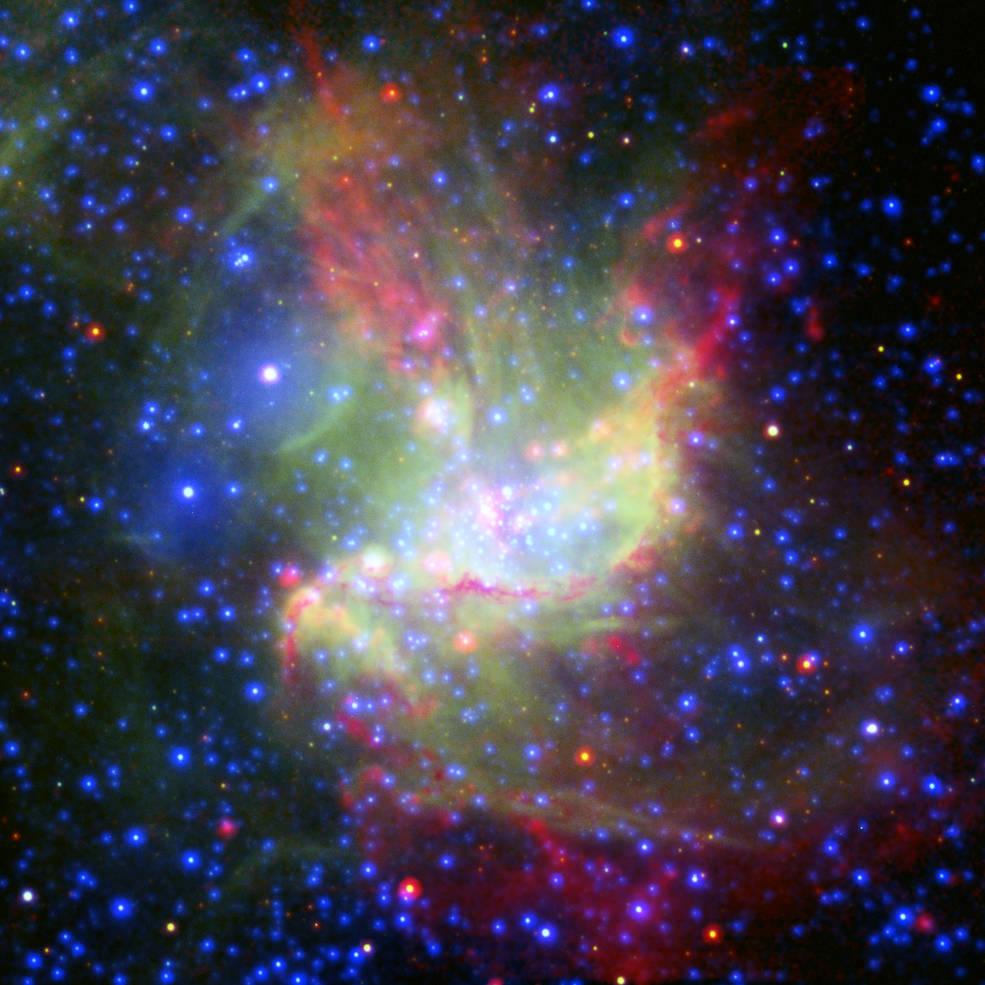
James Webb Space Telescope image of star formation in NGC 346

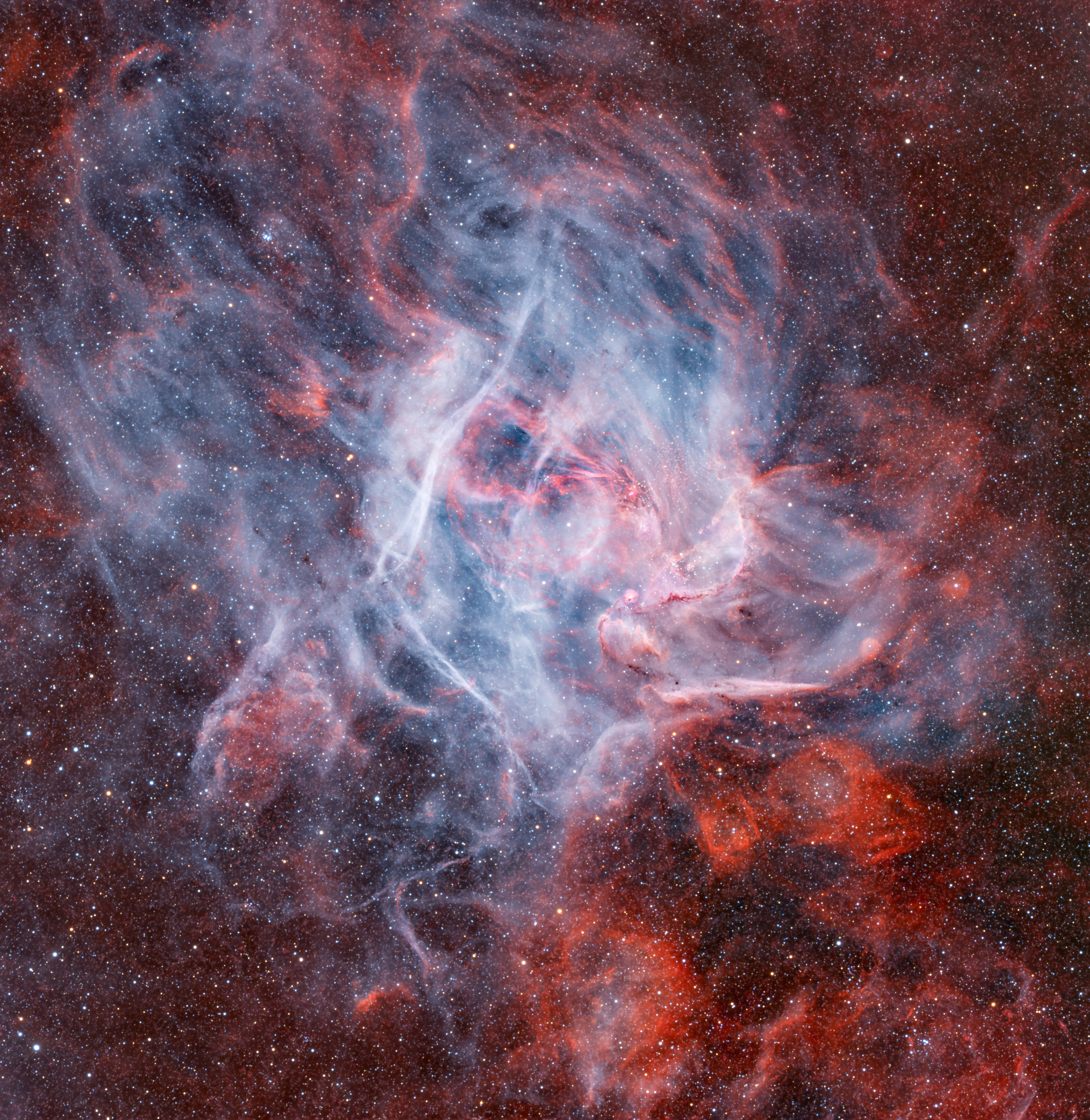
Narrowband view of NGC 346 showing complex ionized gas structures shaped by radiation from young massive stars.

Prominent stars
Walborn	ELS	MPG	NMC	SSN	Spectral type	Effective temperature (K)	Absolute magnitude	Bolometric magnitude	Mass (M_{☉})
	207758	755 (HD 5980/AB5)			LBV; WN4; OI	45,000; 45,000; 34,000	−7.1 (−8.1) −6.8 −6.7	−11.135 −10.885 −9.885	61; 66; 34
1		435	26	7	O5.5If	43,400	−6.7	−10.7	91
	1	789		5	O7If	38,900	−7	−10.7	85
3		355	29	9	O3V	51,300	−5.7	−10.3	76
6	7	324	32	13	O4V	48,600	−5.2	−9.6	54
4		342	30	11	O5.5V	44,900	−5.5	−9.7	53
		368	28	15	O5.5V	44,900	−5	−9.2	43
2		470	25		O8.5III	35,700	−5.4	−8.9	34

== See also ==
- List of most massive stars
