= HD 93250 =

Highly luminous binary star system in the constellation Carina

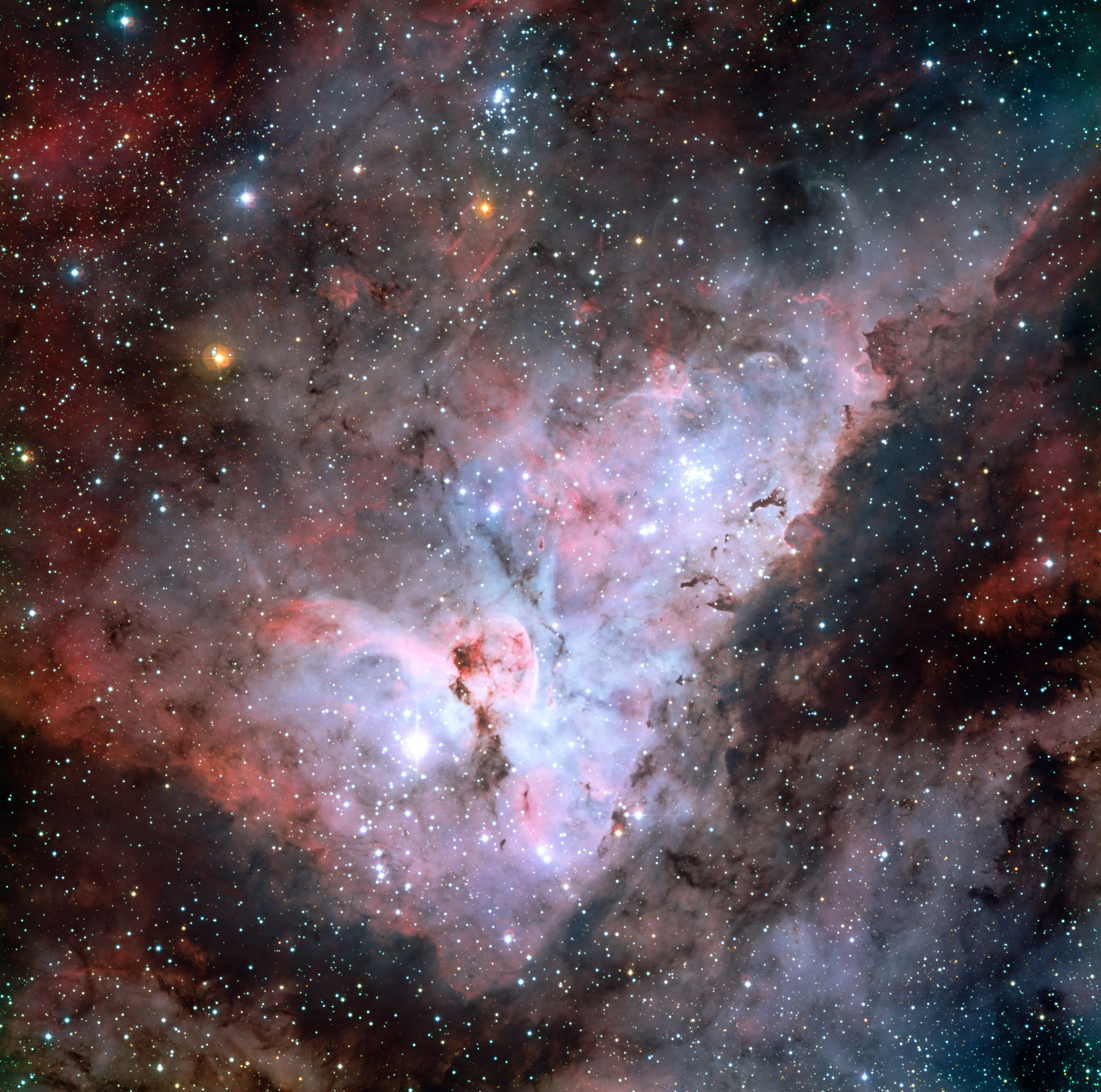
- HD 93250 (circled in red) in the Carina Nebula, directly north of the Keyhole Nebula; Credit: ESO

Observation data Epoch J2000 Equinox ICRS
- Constellation: Carina
- Right ascension: 10^{h} 44^{m} 45.028^{s}
- Declination: −59° 33′ 54.68″
- Apparent magnitude (V): 7.41

Characteristics
- Spectral type: O4 IV(fc)
- U−B color index: −0.85
- B−V color index: +0.17

Astrometry
Radial velocity (R_{v})	11.6 km/s
Proper motion (μ)	RA: −7.116 mas/yr Dec.: +3.081 mas/yr
Parallax (π)	0.4115±0.0199 mas
Distance	7,900 ± 400 ly (2,400 ± 100 pc)
Absolute magnitude (M_{V})	−6.14

Orbit
Period (P)	194.31±0.39 d
Semi-major axis (a)	1.224±0.028 mas
Eccentricity (e)	0.217±0.011
Inclination (i)	22±41°
Longitude of the node (Ω)	59±20°
Argument of periastron (ω) (secondary)	171±24°

Details
Radius	15.9 R_{☉}
Luminosity	1,000,000 L_{☉}
Surface gravity (log g)	3.96 cgs
Temperature	46,000 K
Rotational velocity (v sin i)	130 km/s
Age	1.3 Myr

A
Mass	49 M_{☉}

Other designations
- 1E 104248-5918.0, XMMU J104444.8-593354, ALS 1859, 2E 2317, HIP 52558, CD-58°3537, GC 14791, CGO 246, GCRV 25947, PPM 339400, Trumpler 16 180, SAO 238423, Trumpler 14 101, TYC 8626-2075-1, CPC 20°3140, GOS G287.51-00.54 01, CPD−58°2661, GSC 08626-02075

Database references
SIMBAD	data

HD 93250 is a highly luminous hot blue binary star in the Carina Nebula in the constellation Carina.

== Location ==
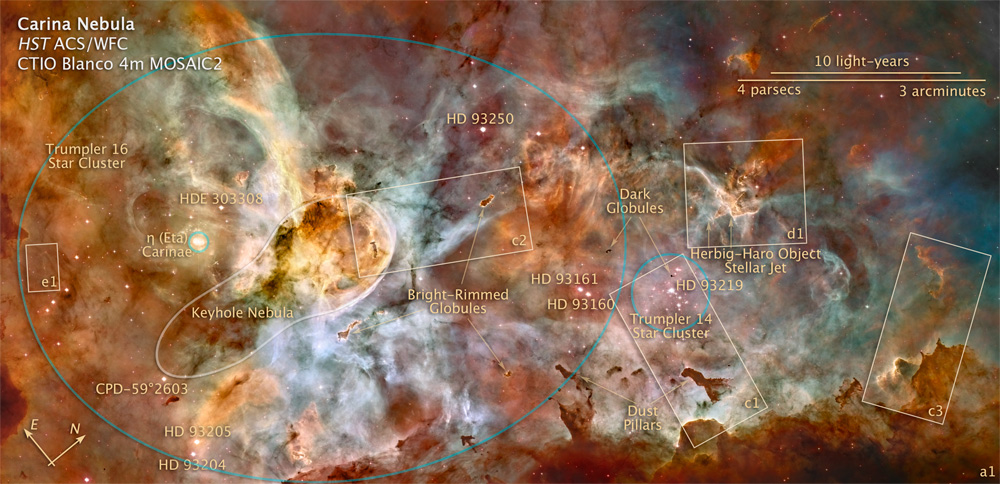
HD 93250 is marked above centre in this mosaic of the Carina Nebula region.

HD 93250 is one of the brightest stars in the region of the Carina Nebula. It is only 7.5 arc-minutes from the famous Eta Carinae and HD 93250 is considered to be a member of the same loose open cluster Trumpler 16, although it appears closer to the more compact Trumpler 14.

HD 93250 is in a region of the Carina Nebula with several bright stars, for example HD 93268 and HDE 303311, but relatively few faint stars. It has been proposed that these bright stars are the core of a separate cluster called Collinder 232, but the lack of any concentration of fainter stars in the area makes it more likely that Collinder 232 is not a real cluster and HD 93250 is just an outlying member of one of the more obvious clusters.

Membership of Trumpler 16 constrains the distance and likely age of HD 93250.

== Spectrum ==
Although HD 93250 is known to be a binary star, individual spectra of the two components have never been observed, but they are thought to be very similar. The spectral type of HD 93250 has variously been given as O5, O6/7, O4, and O3. It has sometimes been classified as a main sequence star and sometimes as a giant star. The Galactic O-Star Spectroscopic Survey has used it as the standard star for the newly created O4 subgiant spectral type.

== Binary ==
HD 93250 is the brightest x-ray source in the Carina Nebula. It has long been suspected that this is due to colliding winds in a close pair of hot luminous stars, but investigations have failed to show any significant radial velocity variations to support this. One calculated orbit suggests that a small inclination means the radial velocity changes due to orbital motion will be too small to resolve given the type of spectrum of the two stars.

In 2010, AMBER interferometry resolved HD 93250 into two separate stars. No relative motion or radial velocity variations could be detected and so the orbit and properties of the two stars is still uncertain. The projected separation of the stars is 1.5 mas, approximately 3.5 astronomical units. The two stars show no measurable colour difference and are both likely to be hot O stars with masses within 10% of each other.

== Properties ==
The physical properties of HD 93250 have only been calculated on the assumption that it is a single star. The temperature is around 50,000 K and its luminosity around 1,000,000 L_{☉} Calculations of the mass have shown discrepancies between spectroscopic models and evolutionary models, which may be resolved by analysis of two separate stars in the system.

== See also ==
- List of most massive stars
