= NGC 465 =

Open cluster in the constellation Tucana

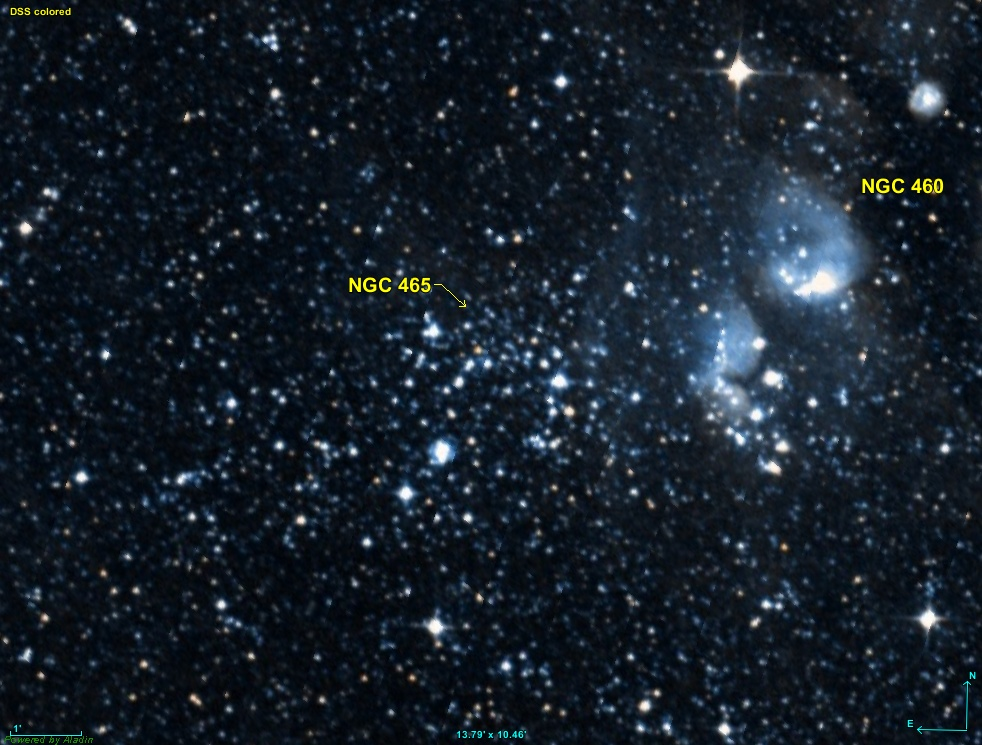

Observation data (J2000.0 epoch)
- Right ascension: 01^{h} 15^{m} 42^{s}
- Declination: −73° 19.7′
- Apparent magnitude (V): 11.5
- Apparent dimensions (V): 5.0' × 4.0'

Physical characteristics

Associations
- Constellation: Tucana

NGC 465 is an open cluster in the Magellanic Clouds, part of the constellation Tucana. It was discovered by Scottish astronomer James Dunlop in 1826.

== See also ==
- List of NGC objects (1–1000)
