= WR 25 =

Triple star system in the constellation Carina

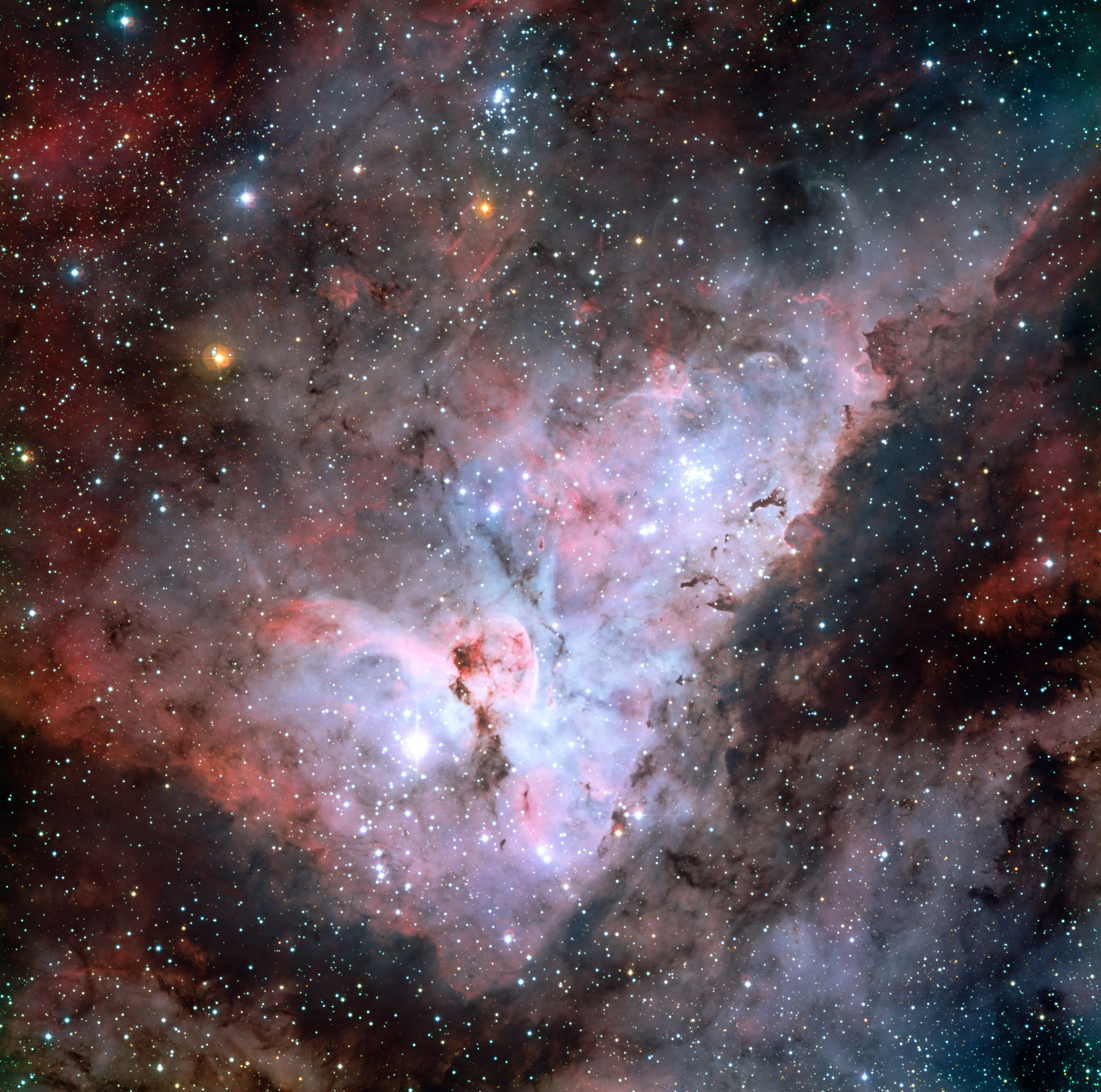
- Location of WR 25 (circled); Credit: ESO

Observation data Epoch J2000.0 Equinox J2000.0
- Constellation: Carina
- Right ascension: 10^{h} 44^{m} 10.337^{s}
- Declination: −59° 43′ 11.41″
- Apparent magnitude (V): 8.80

Characteristics
- Spectral type: WN6ha + O5((f^{+})) + O7((f))

Astrometry
Radial velocity (R_{v})	−34.6 km/s
Proper motion (μ)	RA: −6.918 mas/yr Dec.: +2.764 mas/yr
Parallax (π)	0.4450±0.0203 mas
Distance	7,570 ± 390 ly (2,320±120 pc)
Absolute magnitude (M_{V})	−6.98

Orbit
Primary	Primary
Secondary	Secondary
Period (P)	207.638±0.093 days
Semi-major axis (a)	3.90±0.21 au
Eccentricity (e)	0.595±0.013
Inclination (i)	52±10 or 128±10°
Periastron epoch (T)	2,451,184.08±0.46 HJD
Argument of periastron (ω) (secondary)	212.0±1.6°
Semi-amplitude (K_{1}) (primary)	53.18±0.82 km/s

Orbit
Secondary	Tertiary
Period (P)	19–82 years
Semi-major axis (a)	38–94 au

Details

Primary
Mass	62±13 M_{☉}
Radius	24 ± 2 (Note: Calculated, using the Stefan-Boltzmann law and the star's effective temperature and luminosity, with respect to the solar nominal effective temperature of 5,772 K: $$\sqrt{\biggl(\frac{5,772}{42,200}\biggr)^4 \cdot 10^{6.21}} = 24\ R_\odot.$$ $$\sqrt{\biggl(\frac{5,772}{41,400}\biggr)^4 \cdot 10^{5.48}} = 10.7\ R_\odot.$$ $$\sqrt{\biggl(\frac{5,772}{36,300}\biggr)^4 \cdot 10^{5.08}} = 8.8\ R_\odot.$$) R_{☉}
Luminosity (bolometric)	1,600,000+240,000 −210,000 L_{☉}
Temperature	42,200±1,000 K
Age	2.0±0.2 Myr

Secondary
Mass	31±7 M_{☉}
Radius	10.7 ± 1.2 R_{☉}
Luminosity	300,000+53,000 −45,000 L_{☉}
Surface gravity (log g)	3.9±0.1 cgs
Temperature	41,400±1,700 K
Rotational velocity (v sin i)	87±12 km/s
Age	2.8±0.5 Myr

Tertiary
Mass	25.6+2.8 −2.3 M_{☉}
Radius	8.8 ± 1.0 R_{☉}
Luminosity (bolometric)	120,000+31,000 −25,000 L_{☉}
Surface gravity (log g)	3.9+0.1 −0.2 cgs
Temperature	36,300±2,600 K
Rotational velocity (v sin i)	69±24 km/s
Age	3.0+1.2 −1.7 Myr

Other designations
- HD 93162, 2MASS J10441038-5943111, WR 25, XMMU J104410.3-594311, CD−59°3282, PPM 339385, SAO 238408, Trumpler 16 177, GSC 08626-01989, UBV 9882, Hen 3-478

Database references
SIMBAD	data

WR 25 (HD 93162) is a triple star system in the turbulent star-forming region of the Carina Nebula, about 7,600 light-years from Earth. It contains a Wolf–Rayet star and two O-type stars and is a member of the Trumpler 16 cluster. The name comes from the Catalogue of Galactic Wolf–Rayet Stars.

== Spectrum ==
WR 25 was recognised as a Wolf–Rayet star in the 19th century, because of its brightness and a spectrum dominated by broad emission lines. The spectrum contains lines of hydrogen and is intermediate between a classical WN (Wolf–Rayet) star and an O-type supergiant. This led to early reports that it was a binary, for example a WN7 star plus an O7 star. It has also been described as WN7 + abs (meaning a Wolf–Rayet star with absorption lines of unknown origin) and WN6ha. With the introduction of specific classifications for hot slash stars, WR 25 was assigned the spectral type O2.5If^{*}/WN6. This recognises the presence of nitrogen, the intrinsic weakness of many emission lines, and the presence of some helium and hydrogen absorption lines. The classification represents a fine gradation of weaker emission and stronger absorption than a WN6ha spectral type. Any contribution to the spectrum from the companion cannot be clearly detected.

== Properties ==
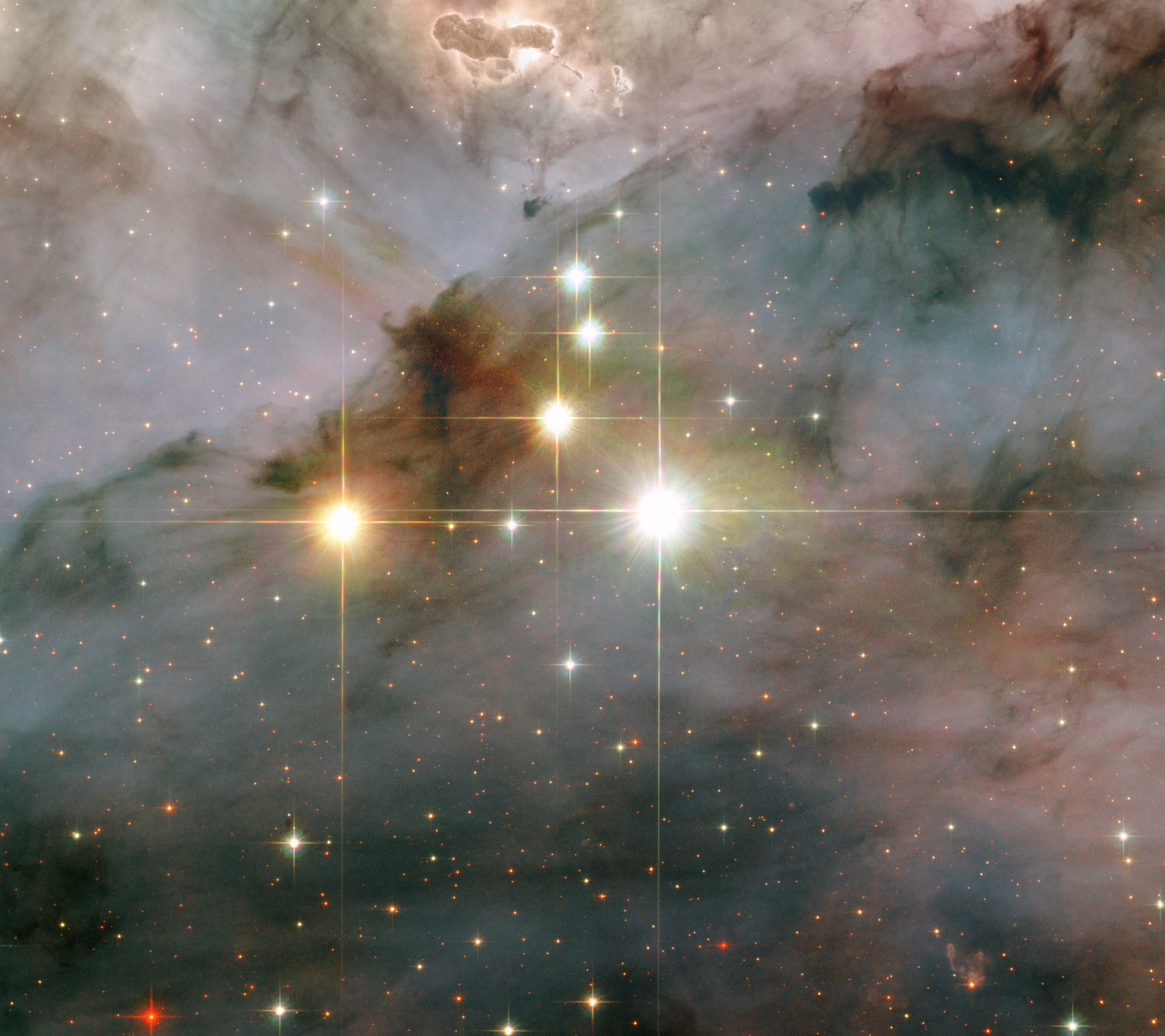
WR 25 is the brightest star in the image. The orange star to its left is a foreground object.

The primary star of the WR 25 system is approximately 2.4 million times brighter than the Sun and illuminates the far southern end of the Trumpler 16 cluster. The model used to derive the stellar parameters is unsuitable for use in binary systems with the authors noting that the companion contributes more than 15% of the system luminosity, so the luminosity is highly uncertain. Earlier estimates based on measurements of the ionising flux produced values around 1.5 million times the sun, with correspondingly lower estimates for other physical data.

The companion is assumed to be a young hot massive star, similar to other known WR+O or WR+WR binaries. It has been reported as an O4 supergiant, but later measurements are still uncertain about the exact spectral type. Colliding stellar winds between two such hot luminous stars produce the hard X-rays that led to suspicion about the binary status long before the 208-day orbital period was detected.

Although very luminous, WR 25 is beyond naked-eye visibility due to heavy dust extinction of clouds in the nebula, and because much of the emitted radiation is in the ultraviolet. With an absolute magnitude of −6.98 at a distance of 1970 parsecs, it would be visible to the naked eye with a stellar magnitude of 4.49 if there were nothing in the way, rather than the actual 8.80. It has been observed in X-rays and infra-red.

WR 25 lies at the western limit of the Trumpler 16 star cluster, part of Carina OB1, one of the largest stellar associations in the Milky Way Galaxy. Because of its extreme luminosity it greatly affects its stellar environment, seen in the thin long arcs and filaments moving away from the star, including the Finger Nebula.

A third component, previously suspected from spectroscopic signatures, was confirmed in 2026 using interferometry. It is an O7-type star with a mass of 26 M_{☉}. Its orbit has not been determined, but the period is estimated to be likely between 19 and 82 years.

== See also ==
- R136a1
- Pistol Star
- WR 102ka
- LBV 1806-20
- List of most massive stars
