= Small Magellanic Cloud =

Dwarf irregular galaxy, satellite galaxy of the Milky Way

- The Small Magellanic Cloud (Source: Digitized Sky Survey 2)

Observation data (J2000 epoch)
- Constellation: Tucana and Hydrus
- Right ascension: 00^{h} 52^{m} 44.8^{s}
- Declination: −72° 49′ 43″
- Redshift: 0.000527
- Distance: 203.7 ± 1.5 kly (62.44 ± 0.47 kpc)
- Apparent magnitude (V): 2.7

Characteristics
- Type: SB(s)m pec
- Number of stars: 3 billion
- Size: 5.78 kiloparsecs (18,900 light-years) (diameter; 25.0 mag/arcsec^{2} B-band isophote)
- Apparent size (V): 5° 20′ × 3° 5′
- Notable features: Companion dwarf to the Milky Way

Other designations
- SMC, NGC 292, PGC 3085, Nubecula Minor

The Small Magellanic Cloud (SMC) is a dwarf galaxy near the Milky Way. Classified as a dwarf irregular galaxy, the SMC has a D_{25} isophotal diameter of about 5.78 kiloparsecs (18,900 light-years), and contains several hundred million stars. It has a total mass of approximately 7 billion solar masses. At a distance of about 200,000 light-years, the SMC is among the nearest intergalactic neighbors of the Milky Way and is one of the most distant objects visible to the naked eye.

The SMC is visible from the entire Southern Hemisphere and can be fully glimpsed low above the southern horizon from latitudes south of about 15° north. The galaxy is located across the constellation of Tucana and part of Hydrus, appearing as a faint, hazy patch resembling a detached piece of the Milky Way. The SMC has an average apparent diameter of about 4.2° (8 times the Moon's) and thus covers an area of about 14 square degrees (70 times the Moon's). Since its surface brightness is very low, this deep-sky object is best seen on clear moonless nights and away from city lights. The SMC forms a pair with the Large Magellanic Cloud (LMC), which lies 20° to the east, and, like the LMC, is a member of the Local Group. It is currently a satellite of the Milky Way but is likely a former satellite of the LMC.

== Observation history ==
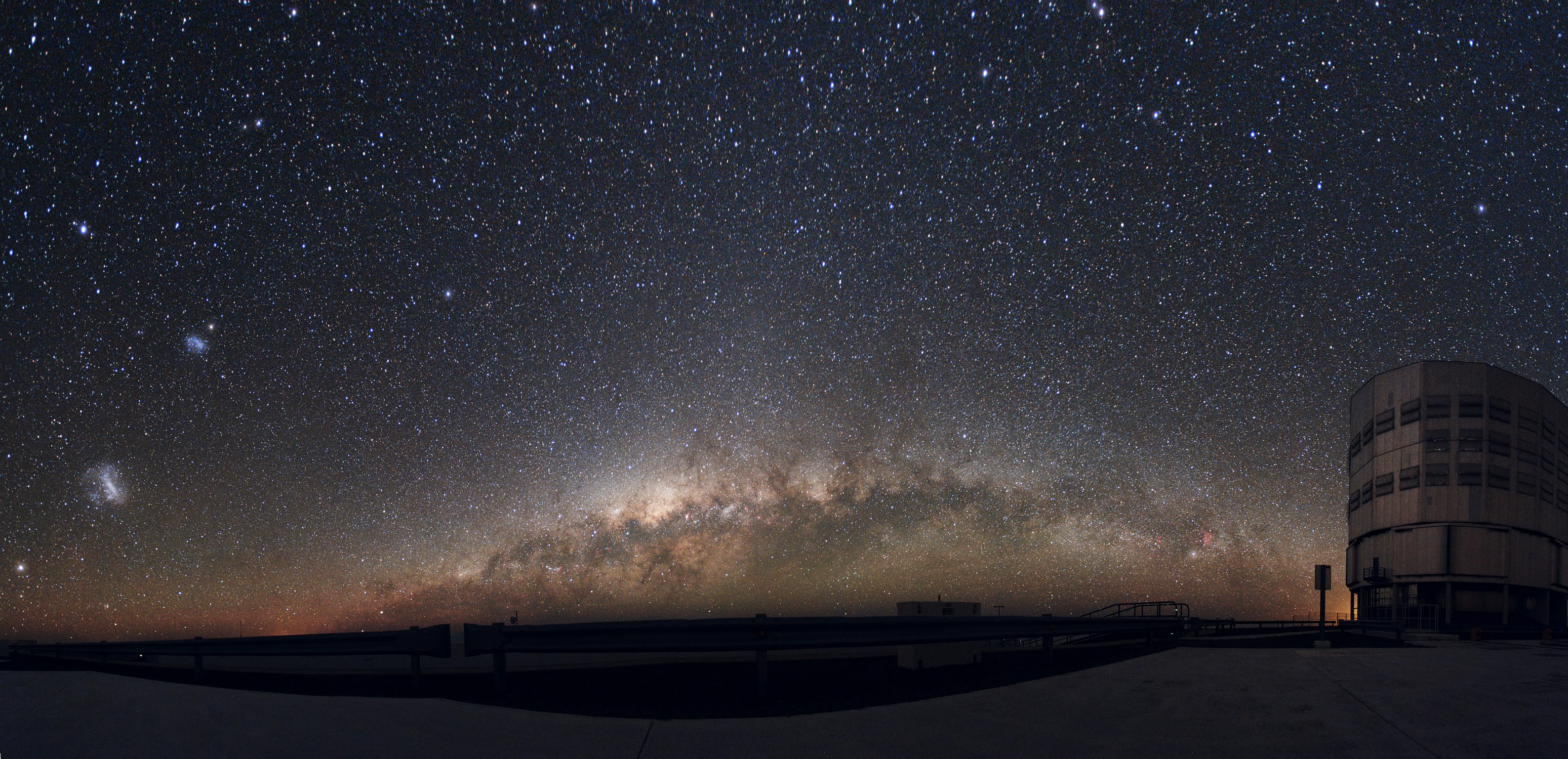
Panoramic Large and Small Magellanic Clouds as seen from ESO's VLT observation site. The galaxies are on the left side of the image.

Constellation of Tucana: the SMC is the green shape at the south (bottom) of the picture

In the southern hemisphere, the Magellanic Clouds have long been included in the lore of native inhabitants, including south sea islanders and indigenous Australians. Persian astronomer Al Sufi mentions them in his Book of Fixed Stars, repeating a quote by the polymath Ibn Qutaybah, but had not observed them himself. European sailors may have first noticed the clouds during the Middle Ages when they were used for navigation. Portuguese and Dutch sailors called them the Cape Clouds, a name that was retained for several centuries. During the circumnavigation of the Earth by Ferdinand Magellan in 1519–1522, they were described by Antonio Pigafetta as dim clusters of stars. In Johann Bayer's celestial atlas Uranometria, published in 1603, he named the smaller cloud, Nubecula Minor. In Latin, Nubecula means a little cloud.

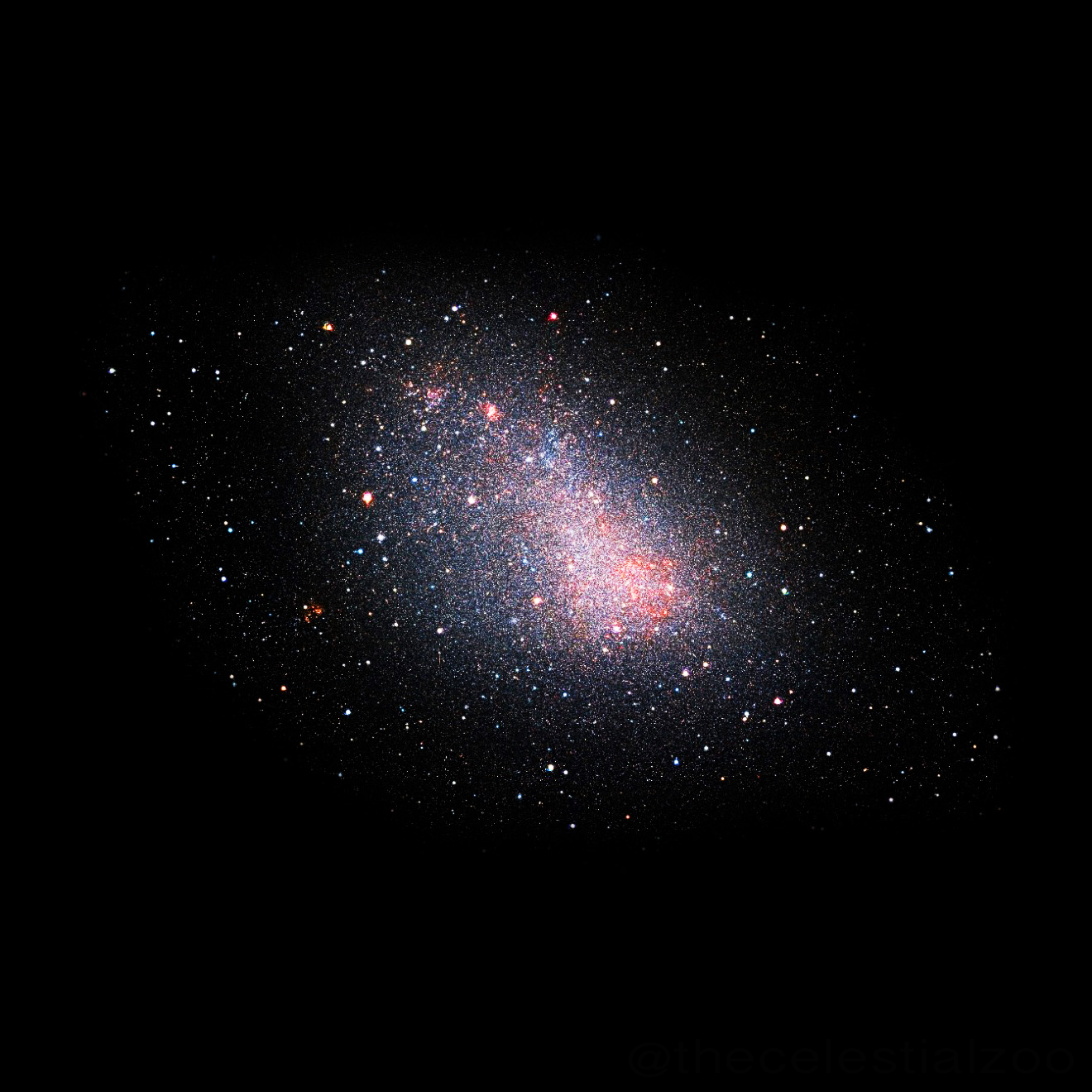
Small Magellanic Cloud as photographed by an amateur astronomer. Unrelated stars have been edited out.

Between 1834 and 1838, John Frederick William Herschel made observations of the southern skies with his 14-inch (36 cm) reflector from the Royal Observatory. While observing the Nubecula Minor, he described it as a cloudy mass of light with an oval shape and a bright center. Within the area of this cloud, he catalogued a concentration of 37 nebulae and clusters.

In 1891, the Harvard College Observatory opened an observing station at Arequipa in Peru. Between 1893 and 1906, under the direction of Solon Bailey, the 24-inch (610 mm) telescope at this site was used to survey photographically both the Large and Small Magellanic Clouds. Henrietta Swan Leavitt, an astronomer at the Harvard College Observatory, used the plates from Arequipa to study the variations in relative luminosity of stars in the SMC. In 1908, the results of her study were published, which showed that a type of variable star called a "cluster variable", later called a Cepheid variable after the prototype star Delta Cephei, showed a definite relationship between the variability period and the star's apparent brightness. Leavitt realized that since all the stars in the SMC are roughly the same distance from Earth, this result implied a similar relationship between period and absolute brightness. This important period–luminosity relation allowed the distance to any other Cepheid variable to be estimated in terms of the distance to the SMC. She hoped a few Cepheid variables could be found close enough to Earth so that their parallax, and hence distance from Earth, could be measured. This soon happened, allowing Cepheid variables to be used as standard candles, facilitating many astronomical discoveries.

Using this period–luminosity relation, in 1913, the distance to the SMC was first estimated by Ejnar Hertzsprung. First, he measured thirteen nearby cepheid variables to find the absolute magnitude of a variable with a period of one day. By comparing this to the periodicity of the variables as measured by Leavitt, he was able to estimate a distance of 10,000 parsecs (30,000 light years) between the Sun and the SMC. This later proved to be a gross underestimate of the true distance, but it did demonstrate the potential usefulness of this technique.

Announced in 2006, measurements with the Hubble Space Telescope suggest that either the Large and Small Magellanic Clouds may be moving too fast to be orbiting the Milky Way, or that the Milky Way Galaxy is more massive than was thought.

== Features ==
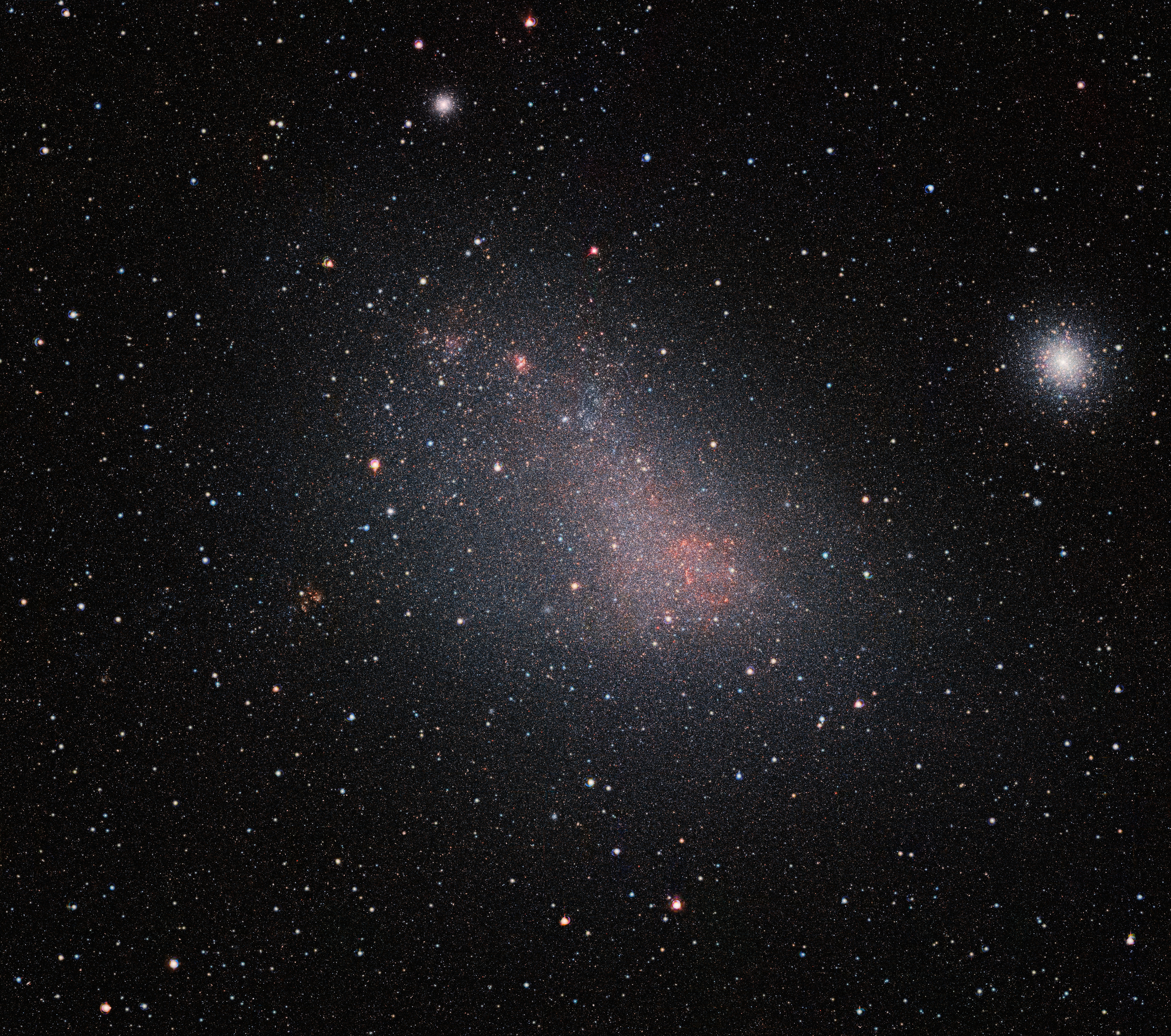
VISTA's view of the Small Magellanic Cloud. 47 Tucanae (NGC 104) is visible to the right of the Small Magellanic Cloud.

Open cluster NGC 376 in the Small Magellanic Cloud, imaged by the Hubble Space Telescope

The SMC contains a central bar structure, and astronomers speculate that it was once a barred spiral galaxy that was disrupted by the Milky Way to become somewhat irregular.

There is a bridge of gas connecting the Small Magellanic Cloud with the Large Magellanic Cloud (LMC), which is evidence of tidal interaction between the galaxies. This bridge of gas is a star-forming site. The Magellanic Clouds have a common envelope of neutral hydrogen, indicating they have been gravitationally bound for a long time.

In 2017, using the Dark Energy Survey plus MagLiteS data, a stellar over-density associated with the Small Magellanic Cloud was discovered, which is probably the result of interactions between the SMC and LMC.

== X-ray sources ==
The Small Magellanic Cloud contains a large and active population of X-ray binaries. Recent star formation has led to a large population of massive stars and high-mass X-ray binaries (HMXBs), which are the relics of the short-lived upper end of the initial mass function. The young stellar population and most known X-ray binaries are concentrated in the SMC's Bar. HMXB pulsars are rotating neutron stars in binary systems with Be-type (spectral type O9-B2, luminosity classes V–III) or supergiant stellar companions. Most HMXBs are of the Be type which account for 70% in the Milky Way and 98% in the SMC. The Be-star equatorial disk provides a reservoir of matter that can be accreted onto the neutron star during periastron passage (most known systems have large orbital eccentricity) or during large-scale disk ejection episodes. This scenario leads to strings of X-ray outbursts with typical X-ray luminosities L_{x} = 10^{36}–10^{37} erg/s, spaced at the orbital period, plus infrequent giant outbursts of greater duration and luminosity.

Monitoring surveys of the SMC performed with NASA's Rossi X-ray Timing Explorer (RXTE) see X-ray pulsars in outburst at more than 10^{36} erg/s and have counted 50 by the end of 2008. The ROSAT and ASCA missions detected many faint X-ray point sources, but the typical positional uncertainties frequently made identification difficult. Recent studies using XMM-Newton and Chandra have now cataloged several hundred X-ray sources in the direction of the SMC, of which perhaps half are considered likely HMXBs, and the remainder a mix of foreground stars, and background AGN.

No X-rays above background were observed from the Magellanic Clouds during the September 20, 1966, Nike-Tomahawk flight. Balloon observation from Mildura, Australia, on October 24, 1967, of the SMC set an upper limit of X-ray detection. An X-ray astronomy instrument was carried aboard a Thor missile launched from Johnston Atoll on September 24, 1970, at 12:54 UTC for altitudes above 300 km, to search for the Small Magellanic Cloud. The SMC was detected with an X-ray luminosity of 5×10^{38} erg/s in the range 1.5–12 keV, and 2.5×10^{39} erg/s in the range 5–50 keV for an apparently extended source.

The fourth Uhuru catalog lists an early X-ray source within the constellation Tucana: 4U 0115-73 (3U 0115-73, 2A 0116-737, SMC X-1). Uhuru observed the SMC on January 1, 12, 13, 16, and 17, 1971, and detected one source located at 01149-7342, which was then designated SMC X-1. Some X-ray counts were also received on January 14, 15, 18, and 19, 1971. The third Ariel 5 catalog (3A) also contains this early X-ray source within Tucana: 3A 0116-736 (2A 0116-737, SMC X-1). The SMC X-1, a HMXRB, is at J2000 right ascension (RA) 01^{h} 15^{m} 14^{s} declination (Dec) −73° 42′ 22″.

Two additional sources detected and listed in 3A include SMC X-2 at 3A 0042-738 and SMC X-3 at 3A 0049-726.

== Mini Magellanic Cloud (MMC) ==
It has been proposed by astrophysicists D. S. Mathewson, V. L. Ford, and N. Visvanathan that the SMC may, in fact, be split in two, with a smaller section of this galaxy behind the main part of the SMC (as seen from Earth's perspective), and separated by about 30,000 ly. They suggest the reason for this is due to a past interaction with the LMC that split the SMC, and that the two sections are still moving apart. They dubbed this smaller remnant the Mini Magellanic Cloud.

In 2023, it was reported that the SMC is indeed two separate structures with distinct stellar and gaseous chemical compositions, separated by around 5 kiloparsecs.

== See also ==
- Objects within the Small Magellanic Cloud:
  - NGC 121
  - NGC 265
  - NGC 290
  - NGC 346
  - NGC 602
