= Haro 2 =

Blue compact galaxy in the constellation Ursa Major

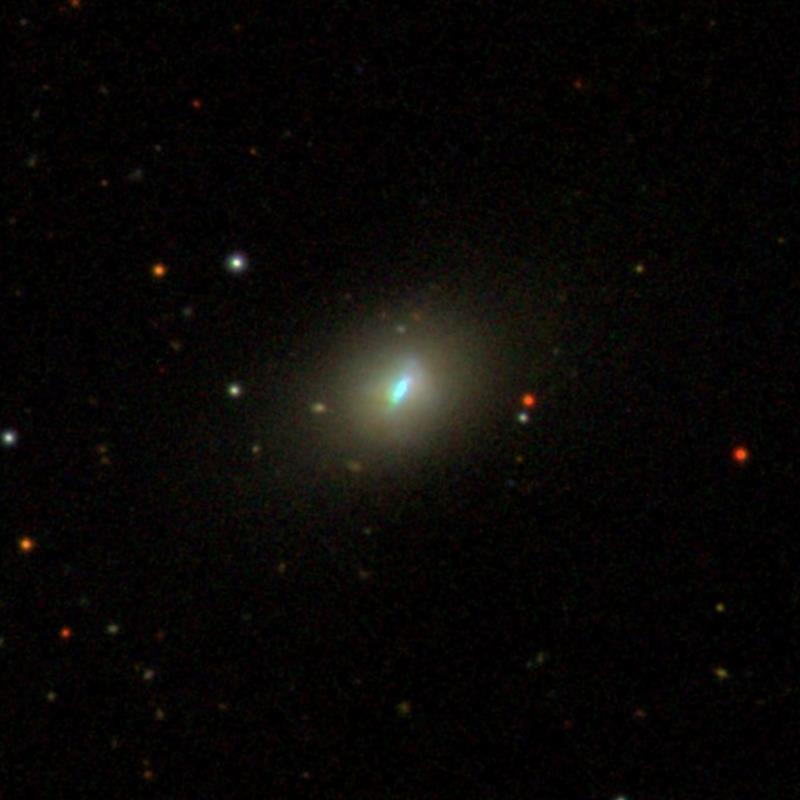
- Haro 2 by Sloan Digital Sky Survey

Observation data (J2000 epoch)
- Constellation: Ursa Major
- Right ascension: 10^{h} 32^{m} 32.0^{s}
- Declination: 54° 24′ 02″
- Redshift: 0.004796 ± 0.000007
- Heliocentric radial velocity: 1438 ± 2 km/s
- Distance: 124 ± 58 Mly (38 ± 18 Mpc)
- Apparent magnitude (V): 13.1

Characteristics
- Type: Im pec
- Apparent size (V): 1.12′ × 0.80′
- Notable features: Blue compact dwarf

Other designations
- UGC 5720, Arp 233, MRK 33, MCG +09-17-070, PGC 31141

Haro 2 is a blue compact galaxy in the constellation Ursa Major. The galaxy lies about 120 million light years away from Earth based on redshift independent measurements, which means, given its apparent dimensions, that Haro 2 is approximately 45,000 light years across, while redshift indicates a distance of 70 million light years.

Guillermo Haro first described H2 in a study published in 1956 listing 44 galaxies that were blue. Blue compact galaxies have been found to host large numbers of young massive stars due to a burst of star formation. The galaxy spectrum features emission from Wolf-Rayet stars. The age of the current starburst activity is calculated to be 5.8 ± 1.0 million years.

An outflow of ionised gas around the central HII region forming a shell could be galactic wind created by the starburst activity in the centre of the galaxy. The galaxy has been found to emit Lyman-alpha both from the central HII region and the shell. The expanding shell has also been observed in X-rays with ROSAT, indicating it forms a superbubble. Imaging of CO(2–1) indicates that the shell has entrained molecular gas. The kinematics of the shell suggest that it has an age of 5 to 6 million years.

== See also ==
- NGC 3353 - a similar dwarf galaxy
