= VT 1137-0337 =

Pulsar wind nebula in the constellation Leo

Nebula
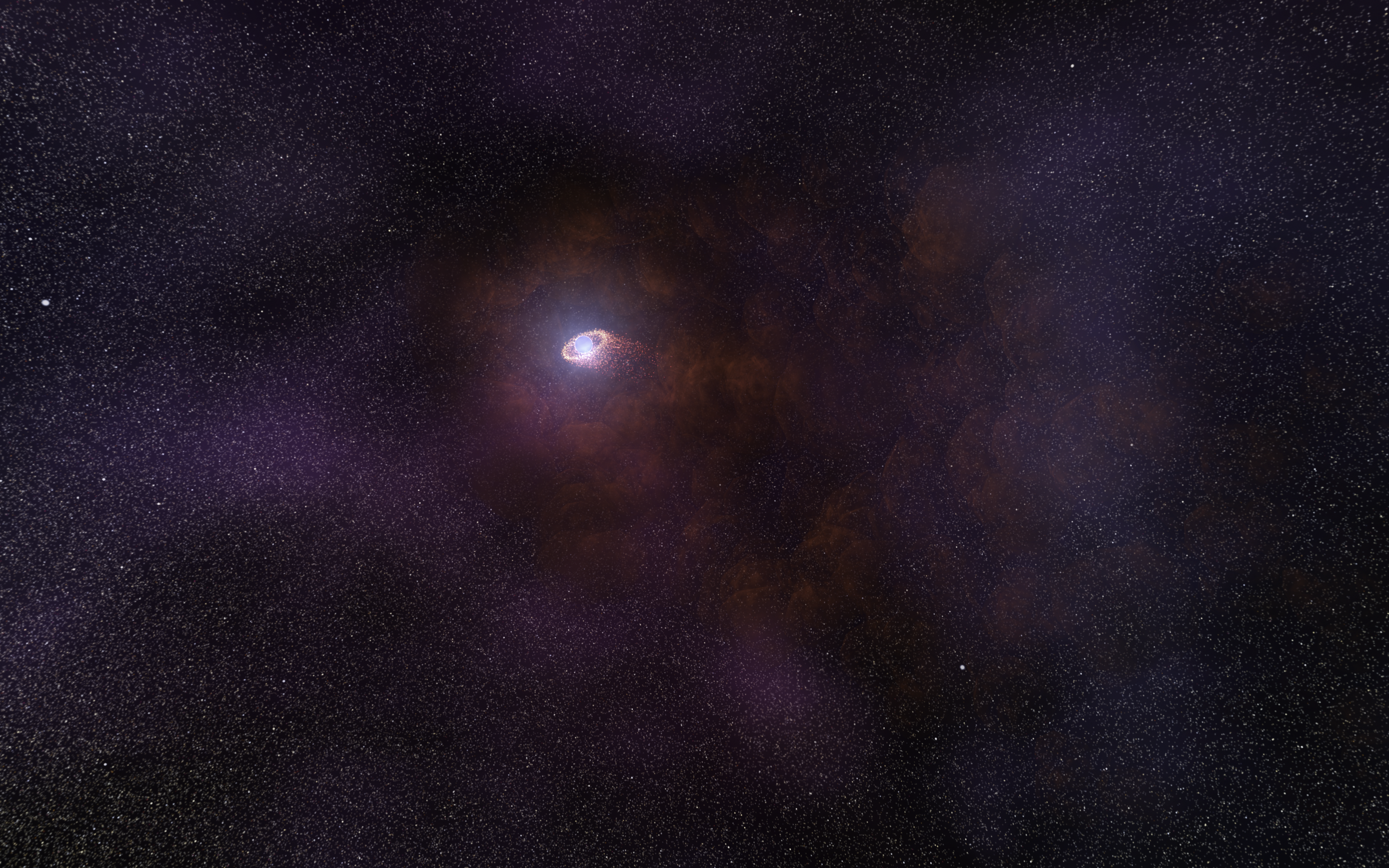
- An artistic impression of a Pulsar Wind Nebula, the same type of object as VT 1137-0337

Observation data: J2000 epoch
- Right ascension: 11^{h} 37^{m} 06.19^{s}
- Declination: −03° 37′ 37.3″
- Distance: 395 million light years ly
- Constellation: Leo
- Notable features: A extragalactic Pulsar Wind Nebula

VT 1137-0337 is a extragalactic pulsar wind nebula (possibly a magnetar nebula) that is located 395 million light years away from planet earth in the dwarf galaxy named SDSS J113706.18-033737.1, a galaxy going through a burst of star formation. It was created through the supernova of a massive star just 14-80 years ago.

== Formation ==
VT 1137-0337 was formed 14 to 80 years ago when a massive star went supernova leaving behind a supernova remnant and a young pulsar type fast spinning neutron star.

== Neutron star ==
The neutron star left at the center of VT 1137-0337 is fast spinning pulsar type neutron star that has a strong magnetic field creating charged particles travelling at the speed of light in the surrounding space creating a strong radio emission.

== Discovery ==
The nebula VT 1137-0337 was spotted by using the Very Large Array Sky Survey (also called VLASS).
