= NGC 3264 Group =

Galaxy group

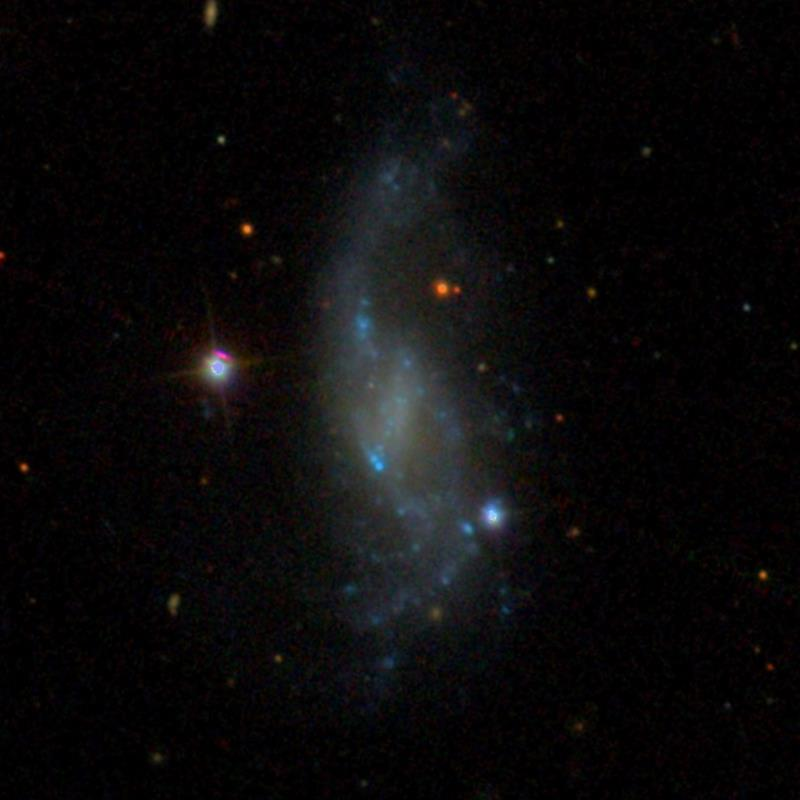
- NGC 3264 imaged by SDSS

Observation data (Epoch B1950.0)
- Constellation: Ursa Major
- Right ascension: 10^{h} 27^{m} 44.5^{s}
- Declination: +56° 39′ 51″
- Number of galaxies: 6
- Distance: 16.8 ± 2.2 Mpc (54.8 ± 7.2 Mly)

The NGC 3264 Group is a galaxy group consisting of six galaxies located in the constellation of Ursa Major. The mean distance between this group and the Milky Way is 16.8 megaparsecs (55 Mly). All of these galaxies are luminous in the X-ray domain.

== Members ==
The table below lists the six galaxies mentioned in the order given in the article by Sengupta and Balasubramanyam (2006).

The same group, with the same member galaxies, was also reported by A. M. Garcia (1993).

Members of the NGC 3264 Group
Name	Classification	Type	RA (J2000)	Dec (J2000)	Radial velocity (km/s)	Apparent magnitude	Distance (Mpc)	Diameter (kly)
NGC 3206	SB(s)cd	Barred spiral	10^{h} 21^{m} 47.6^{s}	+56° 55′ 50″	1151 ± 1	11.9	19.3 ± 1.4	80
NGC 3220	SB(s)cd?	Barred spiral	10^{h} 23^{m} 44.6^{s}	+57° 01′ 37″	1162 ± 2	13.1	19.5 ± 1.4	38
NGC 3264	SBdm	Barred Magellanic spiral	10^{h} 32^{m} 19.7^{s}	+56° 05′ 07″	941 ± 1	12.0	16.3 ± 1.5	62
NGC 3353	Sb? pec	Spiral	10^{h} 45^{m} 22.4^{s}	+55° 57′ 37″	941 ± 1	12.8	13.2 ± 1.0	18
UGC 5848	Sm?	Magellanic spiral	10^{h} 44^{m} 23.1^{s}	+56° 25′ 17″	821 ± 4	14.7	14.5 ± 1.0	32
UGCA 211	Pec	Peculiar	10^{h} 27^{m} 02.0^{s}	+56° 16′ 14″	835 ± 2	15.9	14.7 ± 1.1	10

The website DeepskyLog allows users to easily determine the constellations of the galaxies listed above. Alternatively, the constellation tool can identify the constellation using celestial coordinates. Unless otherwise stated, the data are taken from the NASA/IPAC Extragalactic Database.
