= V453 Cygni =

Variable Star in the constellation Cygnus

- Location of V453 Cygni

Observation data Epoch J2000.0 Equinox J2000.0
- Constellation: Cygnus
- Right ascension: 20^{h} 06^{m} 34.97^{s}
- Declination: +35° 44′ 26.3″
- Apparent magnitude (V): 8.29 - 8.72

Characteristics
- Variable type: Algol

A
- Evolutionary stage: main sequence
- Spectral type: B0.4IV
- Variable type: β Cep

B
- Evolutionary stage: main sequence
- Spectral type: B0.7IV

Astrometry
Radial velocity (R_{v})	-15 km/s
Proper motion (μ)	RA: -3.129 mas/yr Dec.: -6.605 mas/yr
Parallax (π)	0.5263±0.0333 mas
Distance	6,200 ± 400 ly (1,900 ± 100 pc)

Details

A
Mass	14.36 ± 0.20 M_{☉}
Radius	8.55 ± 0.06 R_{☉}
Temperature	27 900 ± 400 K

B
Mass	11.11 ± 0.13 M_{☉}
Radius	5.49 ± 0.06 R_{☉}
Temperature	26 200 ± 500 K

Other designations
- MCW 794, V453 Cygni, BD+35 3964, HD 227696, SAO 69422, TIC 90349611, 2MASS J20063496+3544262

Database references
SIMBAD	data

V453 Cygni (also designated HD 227696 or BD+35° 3964) is a detached eclipsing binary star system located in the constellation of Cygnus. It consists of two massive early B-type subgiant stars in a short-period, slightly eccentric orbit. The system is a member of the young open cluster NGC 6871 and exhibits β Cephei type pulsations in its primary component, making it a key object for studying the evolution and internal structure of high-mass stars. Another star system similar to V453 Cygni is HD 227586 (B0.5IVp).

== Observation ==
V453 Cygni was identified as a variable star in the early 20th century. Detailed photometric observations in the 1960s and 1970s revealed its eclipsing nature, with apsidal motion detected in 1973. High-resolution spectroscopy and light curve analyses in the 2000s provided precise absolute dimensions, confirming its membership in NGC 6871. In 2020, data from NASA's Transiting Exoplanet Survey Satellite (TESS) revealed β Cephei-type pulsations in the primary star, marking V453 Cygni as the first such pulsating star with a dynamically measured precise mass.
