= HESS J1857+026 =

Pulsar wind nebula

Nebula
- Pulsar wind nebula

Observation data: J2000 epoch
- Right ascension: 18^{h} 56^{m} 50.8^{s}
- Declination: ±2° 45′ 50.2″
- Distance: ~9000 pc
- Constellation: Aquila

Physical characteristics
- Dimensions: 0.11° x 0.08°

HESS J1857+026 is a pulsar wind nebula located approximately 9 kpc (29 kly) from Earth in the constellation of Aquila.

HESS J1857+026 releases γ-rays in the range of 0.8−45 TeV. It is most likely powered by PSR J1856+0245, a pulsar located nearby.
