= HD 93403 =

Binary star system in the constellation Carina

Observation data Epoch J2000 Equinox ICRS
- Constellation: Carina
- Right ascension: 10^{h} 45^{m} 44.11931^{s}
- Declination: −59° 24′ 28.1431″
- Apparent magnitude (V): 7.272

Characteristics
- Spectral type: O5.5III(fc)var (O5.5I + O7V)
- U−B color index: −0.747
- B−V color index: +0.212

Astrometry
Radial velocity (R_{v})	14.80 km/s
Proper motion (μ)	RA: −6.326 mas/yr Dec.: +2.306 mas/yr
Parallax (π)	0.1927±0.0706 mas
Distance	3,200 pc
Absolute magnitude (M_{V})	−5.675

Orbit
Period (P)	15.093 days
Semi-major axis (a)	121 R_{☉}
Eccentricity (e)	0.234
Inclination (i)	~31°
Semi-amplitude (K_{1}) (primary)	79.3 km/s
Semi-amplitude (K_{2}) (secondary)	139.0 km/s

Details

Primary
Mass	68.5 M_{☉}
Radius	24 R_{☉}
Luminosity	1,050,000 L_{☉}
Temperature	39,300 K

Secondary
Mass	37.3 M_{☉}
Radius	10 R_{☉}
Luminosity	257,000 L_{☉}
Temperature	40,100 K

Other designations
- HD 93403, HIP 52628, CD−58°3545, 2MASS J10454411-5924281, GSC 08626-00641, TYC 8626-641-1

Database references
SIMBAD	data

HD 93403 is a spectroscopic binary containing two highly luminous hot blue stars. It is about 10,000 light years away in the Carina Nebula in the constellation Carina. It appears to have spectral type O5.5III, but this is composed of two spectra from a blue supergiant and blue main sequence star of spectral type O5.5I and O7V respectively. The two stars orbit every 15 days with a separation that varies from 93 R_{☉} to 149 R_{☉}. The binary is shedding mass at the high rate of 0.0005 M_{☉} per year.

HD 93403 exhibits the Struve-Sahade effect, where the strength of the spectral lines of the individual components varies during the orbit. It also has colliding stellar winds that produce variable x-ray and non-thermal radio emission.

== See also ==
- List of most massive stars
