= POX 186 =

Young dwarf galaxy

- Image taken from the Hubble Space Telescope.

Observation data (J2000 epoch)
- Constellation: Virgo
- Right ascension: 13^{h} 25^{m} 48.6^{s}
- Declination: −11° 36′ 38″
- Redshift: 0.003903
- Heliocentric radial velocity: 1170
- Apparent magnitude (V): 17.0
- Notable features: Blue compact galaxy

Other designations
- POX 186, PGC 46982

POX 186 (also known as PGC 46982), located in the constellation Virgo, is a dwarf galaxy that is still forming. The galaxy is considered very small and distorted compared to most older galaxies, such as our own Milky Way Galaxy. It is currently believed to have first begun forming when two enormous clouds of gas and stars crashed into each other less than 100 million years ago, sparking new stars to form. Some people believe this may be direct evidence of a new theory, speculating that later-forming galaxies in our universe are smaller than galaxies that have been around for billions of years. POX 186 appears near the star Spica, the brightest star in Virgo.

== Sources ==
- http://hubblesite.org/newscenter/archive/releases/2002/16/image/
