= PSR J1856+0245 =

Radio pulsar in the constellation Aquila

Observation data Epoch J2000 Equinox J2000
- Constellation: Serpens
- Right ascension: 18^{h} 56^{m} 50.80^{s}
- Declination: +02° 45′ 50.2″

Characteristics
- Evolutionary stage: Pulsar

Astrometry
Distance	29,000 ly (9,000 pc)

Details
Rotation	80.90668906 ms
Age	20,600 years

Database references
SIMBAD	data

PSR J1856+0245 is a pulsar 9 kpc (29 kly) away from Earth. It shows similar properties to the Vela Pulsar. It completes rotation period every 80.906 milliseconds and is characteristic age of 20,600 years old.

PSR J1856+0245 is believed to be associated with HESS J1857+026, a pulsar wind nebula located in the same region of space.
