= WR 133 =

Wolf-Rayet star and spectroscopic binary star in the constellation of Cygnus

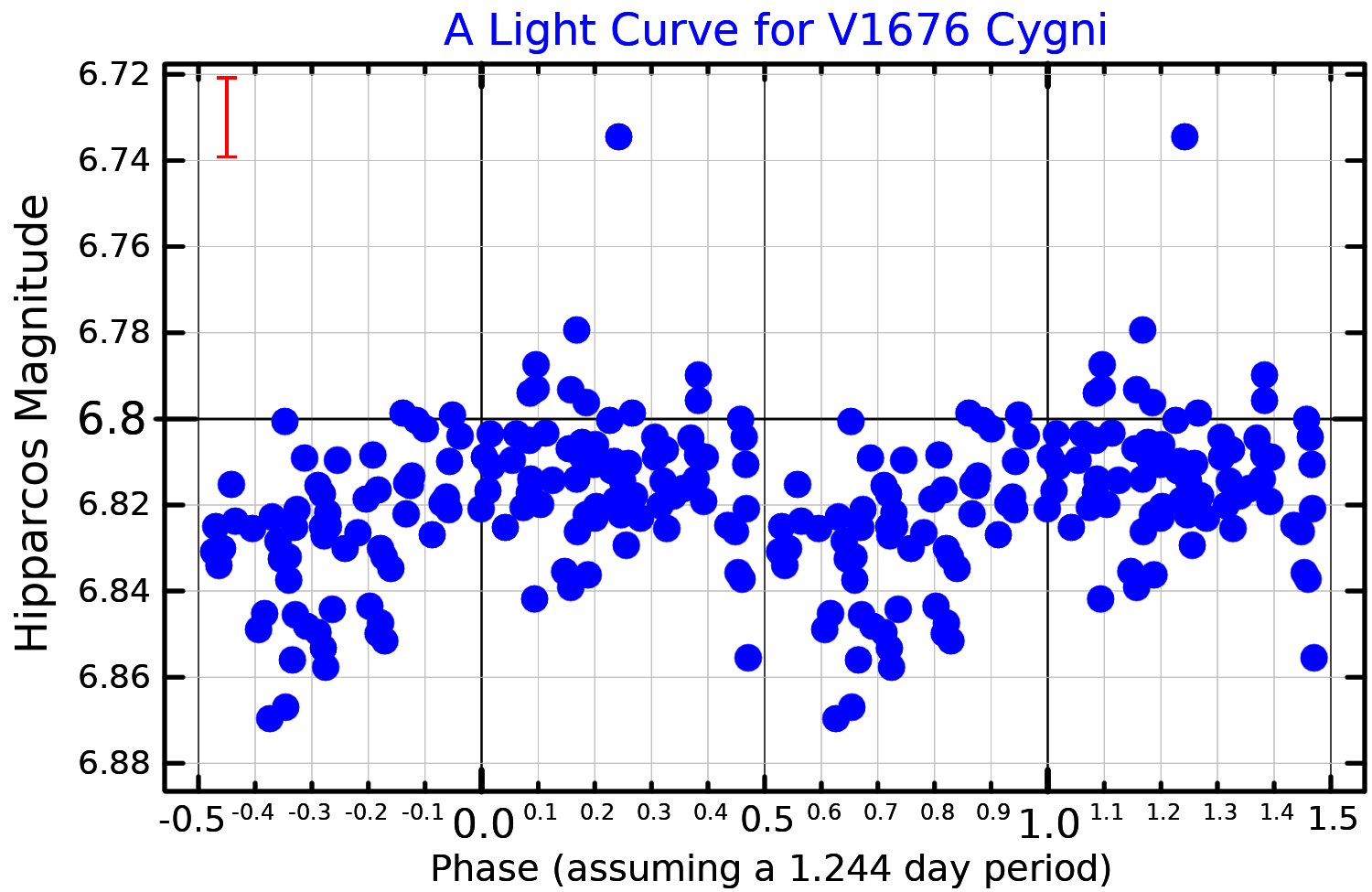
- A light curve for V1676 Cygni, adapted from Marchenko et al. (1998)

Observation data Epoch J2000.0 Equinox J2000.0
- Constellation: Cygnus
- Right ascension: 20^{h} 05^{m} 57.32445^{s}
- Declination: +35° 47′ 18.1508″
- Apparent magnitude (V): 6.75 - 6.84

Characteristics
- Spectral type: WN5o + O9I
- Apparent magnitude (J): 6.319
- Apparent magnitude (K): 6.247
- U−B color index: −0.77
- B−V color index: +0.13
- Variable type: WR

Astrometry
Proper motion (μ)	RA: −3.175 mas/yr Dec.: −6.537 mas/yr
Parallax (π)	0.5380±0.0223 mas
Distance	6,100 ± 300 ly (1,860 ± 80 pc)
Absolute magnitude (M_{V})	−3.4 / −5.4

Orbit
Period (P)	112.736±0.073 days
Semi-major axis (a)	0.7791±0.0024″
Eccentricity (e)	0.3646±0.0103
Inclination (i)	162.08±1.74°
Semi-amplitude (K_{1}) (primary)	13.41±2.34 km/s
Semi-amplitude (K_{2}) (secondary)	32.56±3.98 km/s

Details

WR
Mass	9.3±1.6 M_{☉}
Radius	3.4±0.5 R_{☉}
Luminosity	263,000+68,000 −54,000 L_{☉}
Temperature	71,000±5,000 K

O
Mass	22.6±3.2 M_{☉}
Radius	16.6±1.0 R_{☉}
Luminosity	195,000+50,000 −40,000 L_{☉}
Surface gravity (log g)	3.30±0.15 cgs
Temperature	30,000±1,000 K
Rotational velocity (v sin i)	96±10 km/s

Other designations
- V1676 Cygni, BD+35°3953, HD 190918, HIP 99002, WDS J20060+3547, 2MASS J20055731+3547181

Database references
SIMBAD	data

WR 133 is a visually moderately bright Wolf-Rayet star. It is a spectroscopic binary system containing a Wolf-Rayet primary and a class O supergiant secondary. It is in the constellation of Cygnus, lying in the sky at the centre of the triangle formed by β and γ Cygni, near η Cygni. It is the brightest member of the sparse open cluster NGC 6871.

WR 133 is one of the brightest Wolf Rayet (WR) stars in the northern hemisphere, slightly brighter than WR 140 which also in Cygnus. The WR star is typically identified as the primary, being more luminous, and dominating the spectrum. However, the supergiant secondary is more massive and visually brighter. The primary star is a WN5 nitrogen-rich WR star and the secondary has a spectral type of O9I. The orbit is moderately eccentric and has a period of 113 d, which has been determined from the velocity variations observed with the component's spectral lines, mostly from the HeII emission lines at 541.1 nm for the WR primary, and helium and oxygen absorption lines for the primary. This is the first WN-type WR star to have its mass dynamically determined from orbital motion, although the precision is hampered by the nearly face-on orientation of the orbit.

WR 133 is listed as a Wolf-Rayet variable star and has been given the variable star designation V1676 Cyg in the General Catalogue of Variable Stars. Its visual magnitude varies between 6.75 and 6.84.
