= Stellar-wind bubble =

Cavity of hot gas blown from a star

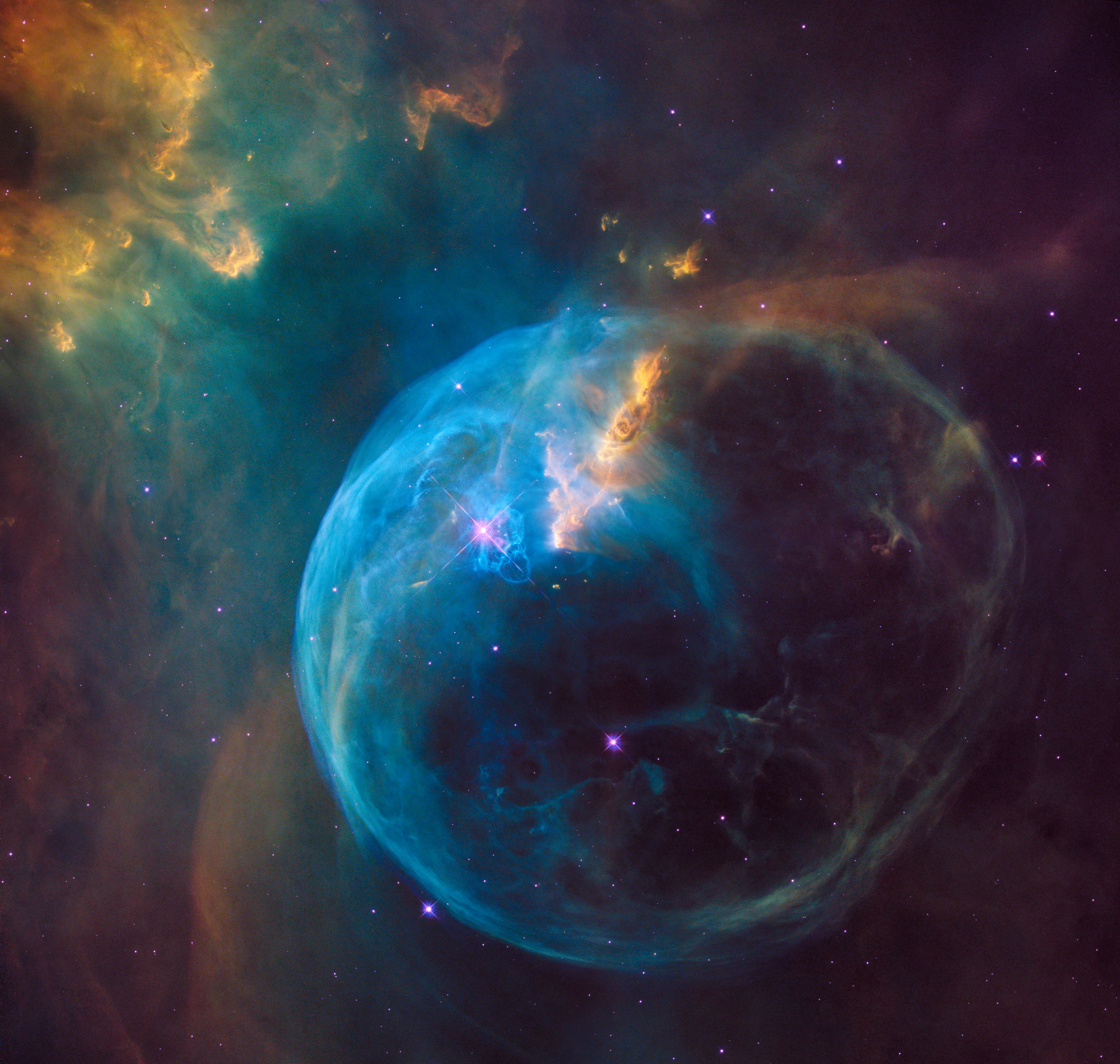
The Bubble Nebula (NGC 7635), imaged by the Hubble Space Telescope, is seven light years across

A stellar-wind bubble is a cavity light-years across filled with hot gas blown into the interstellar medium by the high-velocity (several thousand km/s) stellar wind from a single massive star of type O or B. Weaker stellar winds also blow bubble structures, which are also called astrospheres. The heliosphere blown by the solar wind, within which all the major planets of the Solar System are embedded, is a small example of a stellar-wind bubble.

Stellar-wind bubbles have a two-shock structure. The freely-expanding stellar wind hits an inner termination shock, where its kinetic energy is thermalized, producing 10^{6} K, X-ray-emitting plasma. The hot, high-pressure, shocked wind expands, driving a shock into the surrounding interstellar gas. If the surrounding gas is dense enough (number densities $n > 0.1 \mbox{ cm}^{-3}$ or so), the swept-up gas radiatively cools far faster than the hot interior, forming a thin, relatively dense shell around the hot, shocked wind.

The proposed Shensuo interstellar probes of the China National Space Administration aim to investigate the "nose" and "tail" of the bubble, with launches in 2032 and 2033.

== See also ==
- Cosmic wind
- Planetary wind
- Colliding-wind binary
- Pulsar wind nebula
- Galactic superwind
- Superwind
