= NGC 3264 =

Galaxy in the constellation Ursa Major

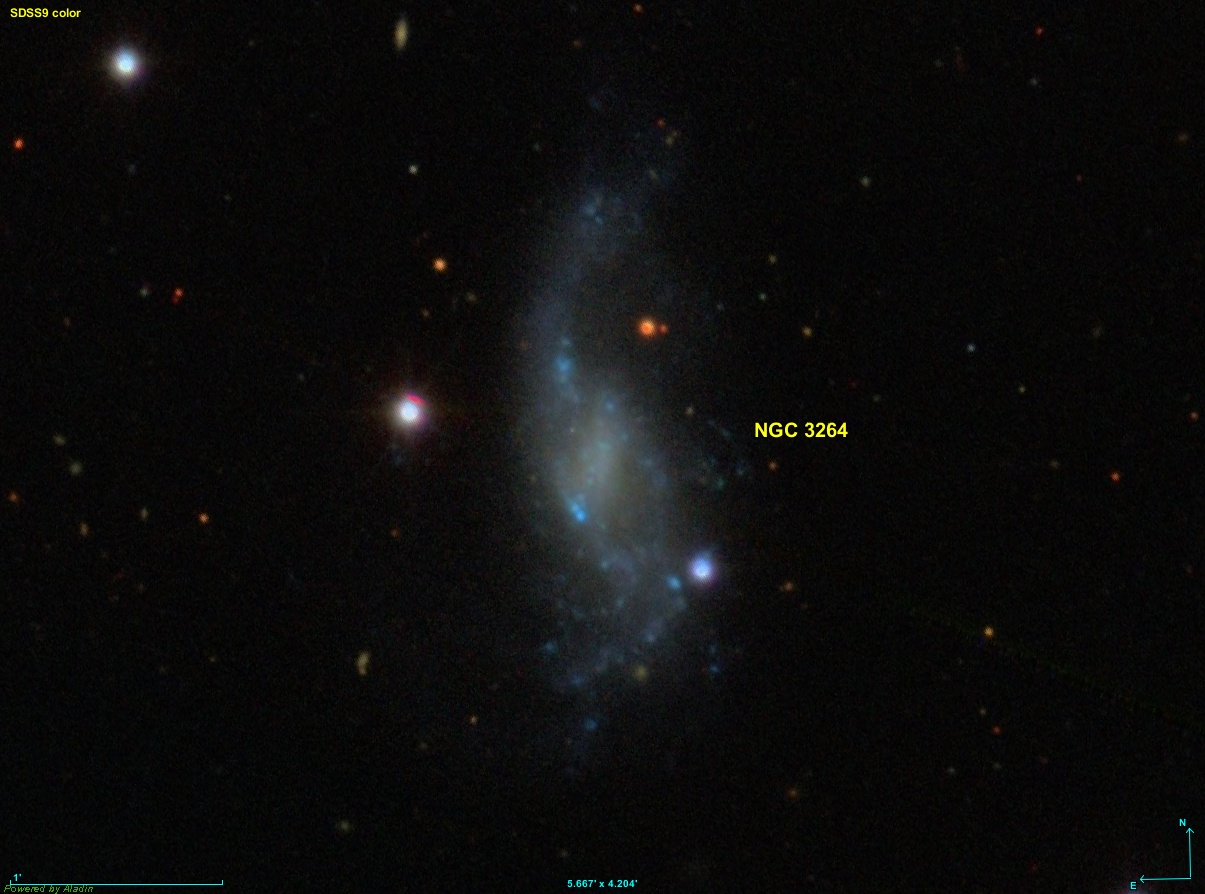
- The spiral galaxy NGC 3264.

Observation data
- Constellation: Ursa Major
- Right ascension: 10^{h} 32^{m} 19.7^{s}
- Declination: +56° 05′ 07″
- Redshift: 0.003139 ± 0.000003
- Heliocentric radial velocity: 941±1 km/s
- Distance: 61.32 ± 13.85 Mly (18.800 ± 4.247 Mpc)
- Apparent magnitude (V): 12.0
- Apparent magnitude (B): 12.5
- Surface brightness: 13.35

Characteristics
- Type: SBdm? SBm SBm?
- Size: 19.14 kpc (Note: Diameter measured in the POSS I 103a-O band.)
- Apparent size (V): 2.9′ × 1.2′

Other designations
- PGC 31125; UGC 5719; MCG 9-17-69; CGCG 266-54; IRAS 10291+5620

NGC 3264 is a spiral galaxy located in the constellation of Ursa Major. It was discovered by the British astronomer John Herschel in 1831.

== Characteristics ==
Its velocity relative to the cosmic microwave background is 1006±12 km/s, corresponding to a Hubble distance of 53.2 ± 3.8 Mly (16.31 ± 1.15 Mpc).

To date, seven measurements not based on redshift give a distance of 61.32 ± 13.85 Mly (18.800 ± 4.247 Mpc). This value lies within the range predicted by the Hubble distance. Since this galaxy is relatively close to the Local Group, this value is likely closer to its true distance. The NASA/IPAC Extragalactic Database calculates galaxy diameters using the mean of independent measurements when available.

NGC 3264 has a luminosity class of IV–V and exhibits a strong H I line. It also contains ionized hydrogen regions.

== NGC 3264 Group ==
NGC 3264 is bright in X-rays and is part of a galaxy group that bears its name. The NGC 3264 Group contains at least six galaxies. The other five members are NGC 3206, NGC 3220, NGC 3353, UGC 5848, and UGCA 211.

The same group, with the same member galaxies, was also mentioned in a study published by A. M. Garcia in 1993.

== See also ==
- List of NGC objects
