= Struve–Sahade effect =

Effect in spectroscopy

The Struve–Sahade effect (S–S effect) occurs in a double-lined spectroscopic binary star system when the strength of the spectral lines of the components varies during the orbital motion.

A spectroscopic binary is called double-lined when the absorption lines of both stars can be observed with a spectroscope. As each member of the star system approaches the observer in turn, the absorption lines of that star are shifted toward the blue end of the optical spectrum by the Doppler effect. Likewise, as a star moves away, its lines are shifted toward the red end of the spectrum. Each of these absorption lines has a characteristic strength that depends on the physical properties of the photosphere. The Struve–Sahade effect occurs when these lines become anomalously weaker as a star's spectrum is red-shifted, and stronger when it is blue-shifted, most noticeable in the secondary component.

This effect is observed in the bright naked eye binary Spica, which consists of two class B stars, and pairs of massive O class stars such as AO Cassiopeiae and HD 93403.

The Struve–Sahade effect was first reported by Otto Struve in 1937. It became important because the effect called into question the values of parameters such as mass and luminosity ratios in massive spectroscopic binary systems. In 1950, Struve attempted to explain the effect as the result of streams of gas trailing behind the secondary star, causing the star to be obscured when the star was moving away. In 1959, Jorge Sahade produced a model where a gaseous stream extended from the primary to the secondary member of the binary, and the opacity of this stream produced the weakening of the absorption lines. The effect then became known as the Struve–Sahade effect. In 1997, Gies and colleagues provided an alternative explanation, arguing that the collision between the stellar winds from the two stars results in a bow shock that is deflected by the Coriolis force, placing it in an obscuring position along the line of sight to the secondary star. Other hypotheses have since been created to explain this effect, but models still do not fully reproduce the observed line strengths.

== See also ==
- Colliding-wind binary
