= NGC 3220 =

Spiral galaxy

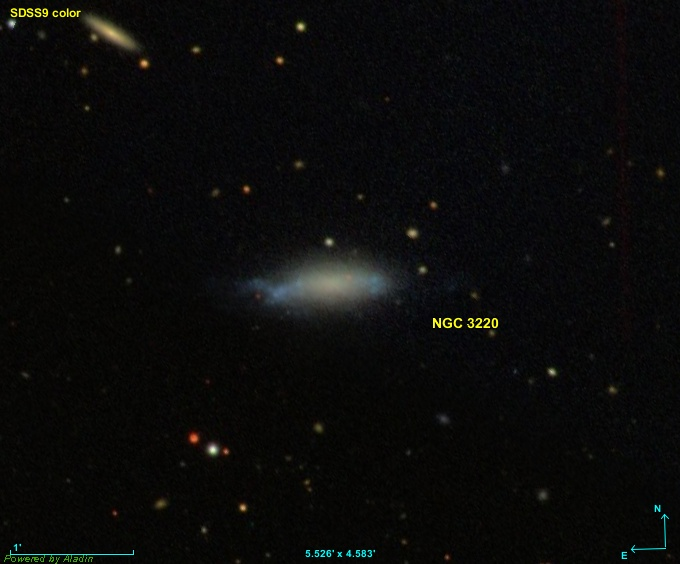
- The spiral galaxy NGC 3220.

Observation data
- Constellation: Ursa Major
- Right ascension: 10^{h} 23^{m} 44.6^{s}
- Declination: +57° 01′ 37″
- Redshift: 0.003875 ± 0.000006
- Heliocentric radial velocity: 1162 ± 2 km/s
- Distance: 63.5 ± 4.5 Mly (19.47 ± 1.37 Mpc)
- Group or cluster: NGC 3264 group
- Apparent magnitude (V): 13.1
- Apparent magnitude (B): 13.9
- Surface brightness: 12.63

Characteristics
- Type: SB(s)cd? Sd
- Apparent size (V): 1.3′ × 0.5′

Other designations
- IC 604, UGC 5614, MCG 10-15-73, PGC 30462, CGCG 390-34

NGC 3220 is a spiral galaxy located in the constellation Ursa Major. It was discovered by the German-born British astronomer William Herschel on 8 April 1793.

The galaxy was also observed by the American astronomer Lewis Swift on 8 August 1890 and was subsequently listed in the Index Catalogue as IC 604.

== Characteristics ==
Its velocity relative to the cosmic microwave background is 1320±11 km/s, corresponding to a Hubble distance of 63.6 ± 4.6 Mly (19.5 ± 1.4 Mpc).

The luminosity class of NGC 3220 is II, and it exhibits a broad H I line.

== NGC 3264 Group ==
NGC 3220 is a galaxy that is bright in X-rays and is a member of the NGC 3264 group, which contains six galaxies. The five other members are NGC 3206, NGC 3264, NGC 3353, UGC 5848, and UGCA 211.

The same group with the same galaxies was also identified in a study published by A. M. Garcia in 1993.

NGC 3206 and NGC 3220 lie in the same region of the sky and, according to a study conducted by Abraham Mahtessian in 1988, they form a galaxy pair.

== See also ==
- List of NGC objects
