= G292.0+01.8 =

Supernova remnant in the constellation Centaurus

Supernova remnant
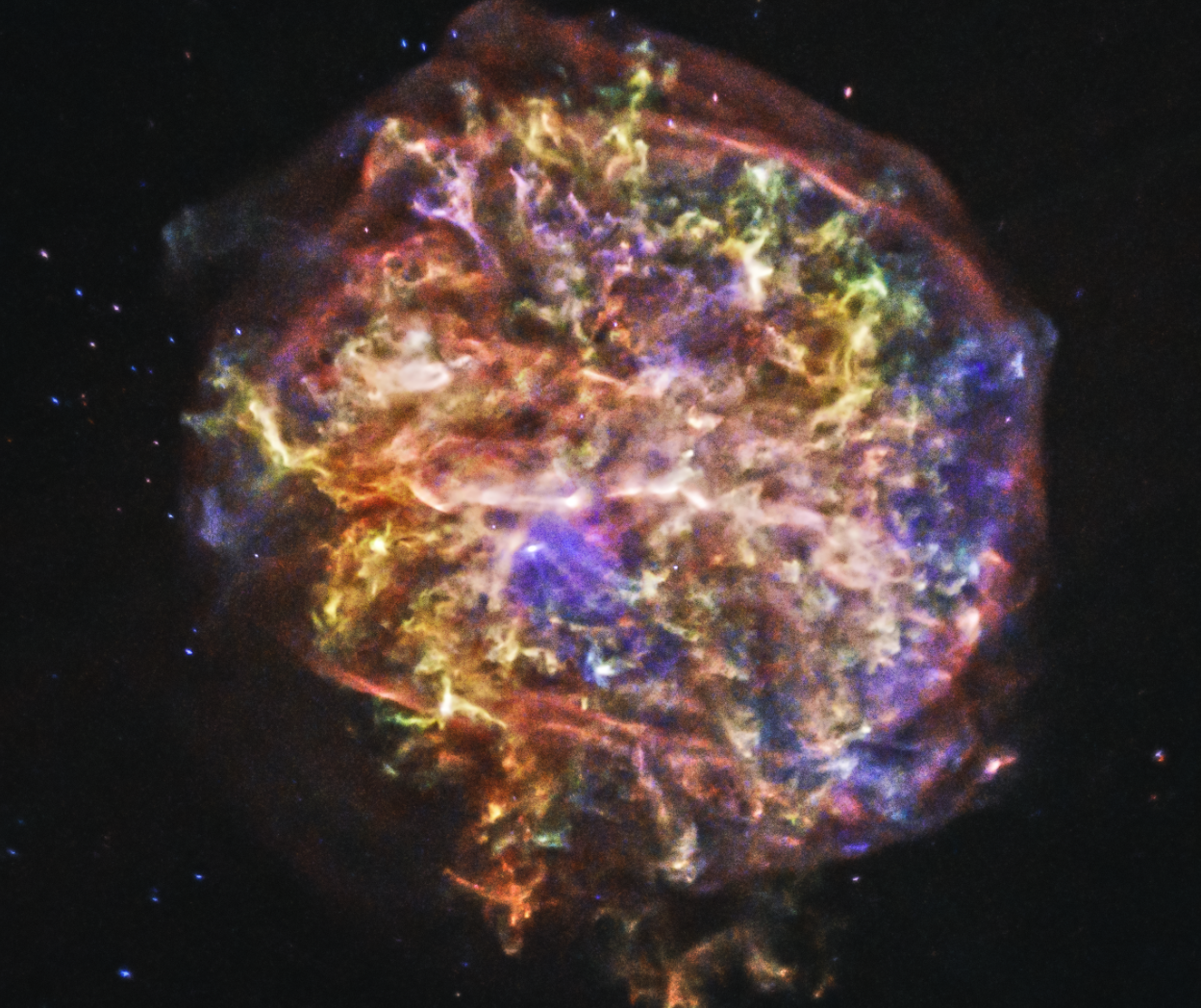

Observation data: J2000.0 epoch
- Right ascension: 11^{h} 24^{m} 27.9^{s}
- Declination: −59° 15′ 39″
- Distance: 6500 ly
- Constellation: Centaurus
- Notable features: associated with PSR J1124-5916

G292.0+01.8 is a supernova remnant located in the constellation Centaurus. It first gained notice as a strong radio source, and eventually deep images revealed a hot optical nebula at the location. It lies about 15,000 light years away.

The remnant's spectrum shows no detectable lines of hydrogen and helium and the presence of only oxygen and neon. The assumption is that a massive star burned through its hydrogen, producing oxygen and neon, and exploded before processing any heavier elements. It must have taken place relatively recently, as the oxygen and neon have not yet mixed with the interstellar hydrogen.

An upper limit of 1500 years has been suggested, and it must be at least a few hundred years old since there are no records from the European presence in the southern hemisphere noting a supernova at this location.

== See also ==
- Crab Nebula
- Pulsar wind nebula

== Sources ==
Murdin, Paul, and David Allen, Catalog of the Universe, pp. 155–156, © 1979 Reference International Publishers Limited.
