= Cosmic wind =

Cosmic stream of charged particles

Cosmic wind is a powerful cosmic stream of charged particles that can push interstellar dust clouds of low density into intergalactic space. Although it easily pushes low density gas and dust clouds, it cannot easily push high density clouds. As the cosmic winds start to push the clouds, they start to separate and start looking like taffy being pulled apart. It has a primary composition of photons ejected from large stars and sometimes thermal energy from exploding stars. It can be caused by orbital motion of gas in the cluster of a galaxy, or can be ejected from a black hole. Because new stars and planets form from gases, the cosmic winds that push the gases away are preventing new stars from forming and are ultimately playing a role in galaxy evolution.

== Description ==
These winds come from the thermal expansion of galactic halos in O and B stars and are further increased by cosmic rays, which shoot out and help push gas out of the halo and disk of its galaxy. In these supernovae, these winds are a result of the conversion of the supernova's thermal energy into kinetic energy which is also further increased by cosmic rays. It is a combination of these hot and cooling flows that cause cosmic wind. In smaller stars, such as the Sun, the wind comes from the Sun's corona and is referred to as solar wind.

== Observation ==
The presence of cosmic wind in the vicinity of a black hole can be noted through the meticulous inspection of absorption line features in the spectra of the accretion disk surrounding said black hole. These features are commonly seen through X-ray telescopes such as the Chandra X-ray Observatory, NuSTAR, and NICER. Before 2007, this was only theorized to occur but several physicists including an astrophysicist named Andrew Robinson analyzed the accretion disk of galaxy that is about 3 billion light years away from the Milky Way. They used the William Herschel Telescope to observe this galaxy, and they noticed that the light surrounding the accretion disk was rotating at similar speeds, proving that accretion disks do release winds. The investigation of the origin and regulating mechanisms of the wind is an active research topic.

== Calculations ==
A method used to calculate these winds is done by using the absorption lines. At low redshifts of ultraviolet star forming galaxies, the outflow velocity and mass loading factor of the wind, scale with the star formation rate (SFR) and stellar mass of the galaxy. The surface area of these winds can be estimated by finding the radius, in the case of a spherically symmetric thin shell, the formula to find this is $M_{wind} = 4{\pi}r^2_{wind}f_{cov}N_Hm_H\mu$ , where $f_{cov}$ is the covering fraction, $r_{wind}$ the radius, $N_H$ the column density of Hydrogen atoms, $m_H$ the mass of the hydrogen atoms, and $\mu$ is the mean molecular weight.

== See also ==
- Galactic superwind
- Stellar wind
- Solar wind
- Planetary wind
- Stellar-wind bubble
- Colliding-wind binary
- Pulsar wind nebula
- Superwind
