= Spica =

Star in the constellation Virgo

- Location of Spica (circled)

Observation data Epoch J2000 Equinox ICRS
- Constellation: Virgo
- Pronunciation: /ˈspaɪkə/ or /ˈspiːkə/
- Right ascension: 13^{h} 25^{m} 11.579^{s}
- Declination: −11° 09′ 40.75″
- Apparent magnitude (V): +0.97 (0.97–1.04)

Characteristics
- Spectral type: B1III-IV + B2V
- U−B color index: −0.94
- B−V color index: −0.23
- Variable type: β Cep + Ellipsoidal

Astrometry
Radial velocity (R_{v})	+0.0±3.1 km/s
Proper motion (μ)	RA: −42.35±0.62 mas/yr Dec.: −30.67±0.37 mas/yr
Parallax (π)	13.06±0.70 mas
Distance	250 ± 10 ly (77 ± 4 pc)
Absolute magnitude (M_{V})	−3.55 (−3.5/−1.5)

Orbit
Primary	Aa
Secondary	Ab
Period (P)	4.0145±0.0001 days
Semi-major axis (a)	28.20±0.92 R_{☉}
Eccentricity (e)	0.108±0.014 or 0.125±0.016
Inclination (i)	63.1±2.5°
Periastron epoch (T)	2,454,189.4±0.02
Argument of periastron (ω) (secondary)	232±1°
Semi-amplitude (K_{1}) (primary)	121.1±2.8 km/s
Semi-amplitude (K_{2}) (secondary)	189.8±2.7 km/s

Details

Aa
Mass	10.0±0.3 M_{☉}
Radius	7.47±0.54 R_{☉}
Luminosity	20,500+5,000 −4,000 L_{☉}
Surface gravity (log g)	3.71±0.10 cgs
Temperature	25,300±500 K
Rotational velocity (v sin i)	165.3±4.5 km/s
Age	12.5 Myr

Ab
Mass	6.4±0.2 M_{☉}
Radius	3.74±0.53 R_{☉}
Luminosity	2,300+1,200 −800 L_{☉}
Surface gravity (log g)	4.15±0.15 cgs
Temperature	20,900±800 K
Rotational velocity (v sin i)	58.8±1.5 km/s

Ac
Mass	1.4 M_{☉}
Radius	1.29 (Note: Calculated with the angular diameter of 1.5″×10^{−4} (0.15 mas) and average distance from the Sun of 80 parsecs: 1.5×10^{−4} • 80 = 0.012 au, or 1.29 R_{☉} using 107.5 as the conversion factor.) R_{☉}

Other designations
- Spica, Azimech, Spica Virginis, α Virginis, Alpha Vir, 67 Virginis, BD−10°3672, FK5 498, HD 116658, HIP 65474, HR 5056, SAO 157923, CCDM 13252-1109

Database references
SIMBAD	data

Spica is the brightest object in the constellation of Virgo and one of the 20 brightest stars in the night sky. It has the Bayer designation α Virginis, which is Latinised to Alpha Virginis and abbreviated Alpha Vir or α Vir. Analysis of its parallax shows that it is located 250±10 light-years from the Sun. It is triple star system, containing an inner spectroscopic binary and rotating ellipsoidal variable; a system whose two stars are so close together they are egg-shaped rather than spherical, and can only be separated by their spectra. The outer companion is orbiting farther away from the binary. The primary is a blue giant and a variable star of the Beta Cephei type. Spica is surrounded by a faint H II region or ultraviolet cloud.

Spica, along with Arcturus and Denebola—or Regulus, depending on the source—forms the Spring Triangle asterism, and, by extension, is also part of the Great Diamond together with the star Cor Caroli.

== Nomenclature ==
The star's name is derived from the Latin spīca virginis "the virgin's ear of [wheat] grain". It was also anglicized as Virgin's Spike. In 2016, the International Astronomical Union organized a Working Group on Star Names (WGSN) to catalog and standardize proper names for stars. The WGSN's first bulletin of July 2016 included a table of the first two batches of names approved by the WGSN; which included Spica for this star. It is now so entered in the IAU Catalog of Star Names.

α Virginis (Latinised to Alpha Virginis) is the system's Bayer designation.

In the Sumerian Starlist found in Uruk (Iraq), 3200-1500 BC, Spica (or a group of stars in Virgo) is called absinnu or šer'u 𒀊𒉆, "The Seed-Furrow".

Other traditional names are Azimech /ˈæzɪmɛk/, from Arabic السماك الأعزل al-simāk al-ʼaʽzal 'the unarmed simāk (of unknown meaning, cf. Eta Boötis); Alaraph, Arabic for 'the grape-gatherer' or 'gleaner', and Sumbalet (Sombalet, Sembalet and variants), from Arabic سنبلة sunbulah "ear of grain".

In Chinese, 角宿 (Jué Xiù), meaning Horn (asterism), refers to an asterism consisting of Spica and ζ Virginis. Consequently, the Chinese name for Spica is 角宿一 (Jué Xiù Yī, English: the First Star of Horn).

In Hindu astronomy, Spica corresponds to the Nakshatra Chitrā.

== Observational history ==
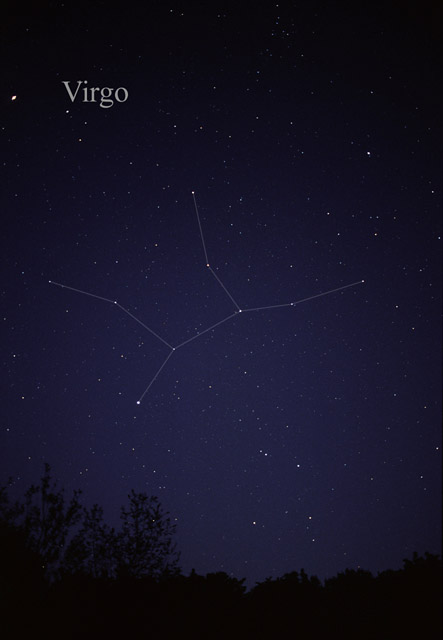
Spica is the brightest star in the constellation of Virgo (lower left).

As one of the nearest massive binary star systems to the Sun, Spica has been the subject of many observational studies.

Spica is believed to be the star that gave Hipparchus the data that led him to discover the precession of the equinoxes. A temple to Menat (an early Hathor) at Thebes was oriented with reference to Spica when it was built in 3200 BC, and, over time, precession slowly but noticeably changed Spica's location relative to the temple. Nicolaus Copernicus made many observations of Spica with his home-made triquetrum for his researches on precession.

== Observation ==
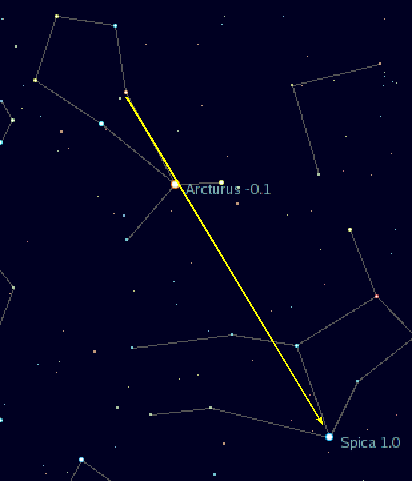
How to locate Spica

Spica is 2.06 degrees from the ecliptic and can be occulted by the Moon and sometimes by planets. The last planetary occultation of Spica occurred when Venus passed in front of the star (as seen from Earth) on November 10, 1783. The next occultation will occur on September 2, 2197, when Venus again passes in front of Spica. The Sun passes a little more than 2° north of Spica around October 16 every year, and the star's heliacal rising occurs about two weeks later. Every 8 years, Venus passes Spica around the time of the star's heliacal rising, as in 2009 when it passed 3.5° north of the star on November 3.

A method of finding Spica is to follow the arc of the handle of the Big Dipper (or Plough) to Arcturus, and then continue on the same angular distance to Spica. This can be recalled by the mnemonic phrase, "arc to Arcturus and spike to Spica."

Stars that can set (not in a circumpolar constellation for the viewer) culminate at midnight—noticeable where viewed away from any polar region experiencing midnight sun—when at opposition, meaning they can be viewed from dusk until dawn. This applies to α Virginis on 12 April, in the current astronomical epoch.

== Physical properties ==
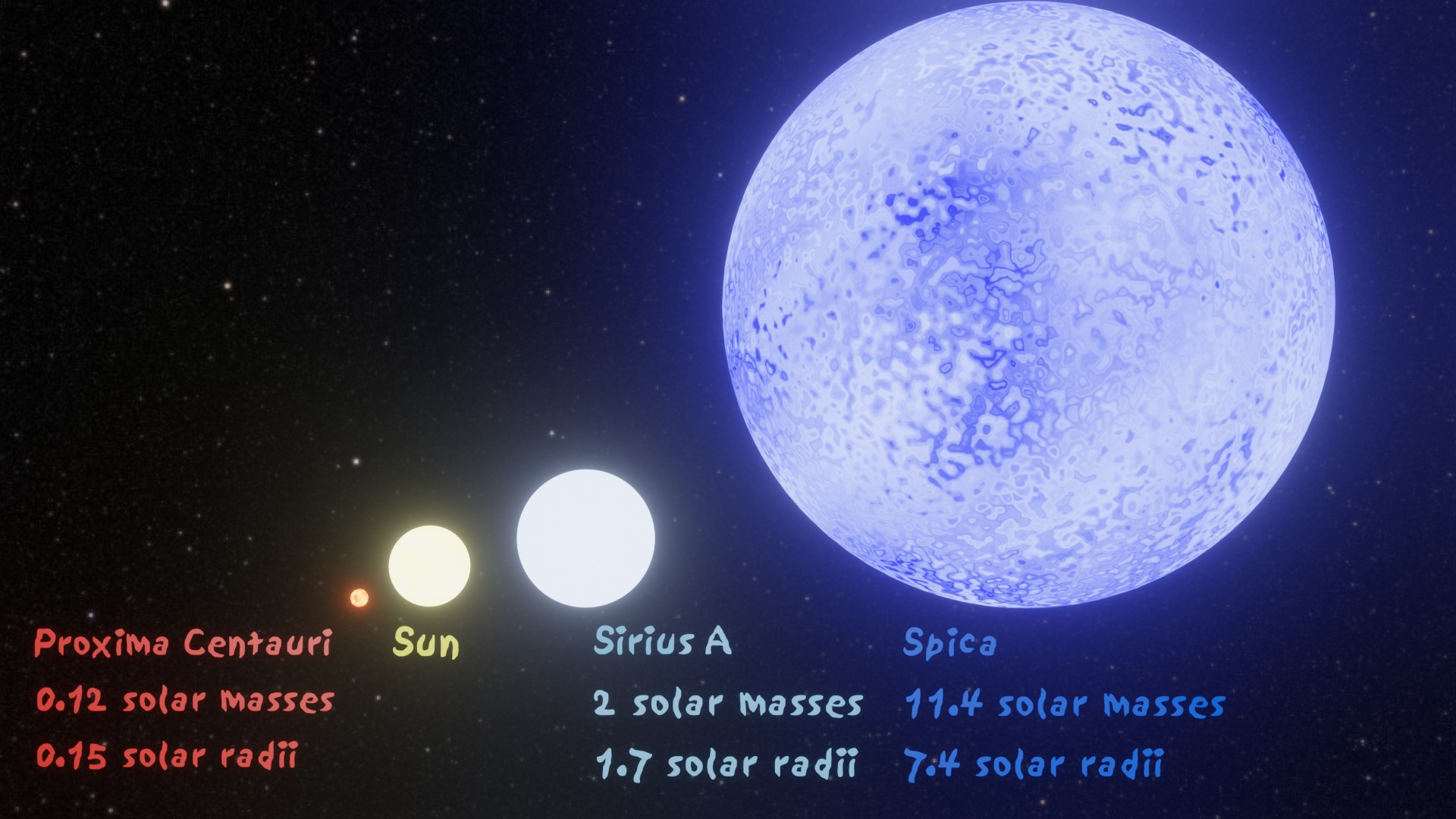
Size comparison of main sequence stars and Spica, including Proxima Centauri, the Sun, and Sirius

Spica is a hierarchical triple system, containing a well-established and well-documented inner binary, which is orbited by a more recently detected companion.

The two inner components orbit each other every four days. They stay close enough together that they cannot be resolved as two stars through a telescope. The changes in the orbital motion of this pair results in a Doppler shift in the absorption lines of their respective spectra, making them a double-lined spectroscopic binary. Initially, the orbital parameters for this system were inferred using spectroscopic measurements. Between 1966 and 1970, the Narrabri Stellar Intensity Interferometer was used to observe the pair and to directly measure the orbital characteristics and the angular diameter of the primary, which was found to be (0.90 ± 0.04) × 10^{−3} arcseconds, and the angular size of the semi-major axis of the orbit was found to be only slightly larger at (1.54 ± 0.05) × 10^{−3} arcseconds.

Spica is a rotating ellipsoidal variable, which is a non-eclipsing close binary star system where the stars are mutually distorted through their gravitational interaction. This effect causes the apparent magnitude of the star system to vary by 0.03 over an interval that matches the orbital period. This slight dip in magnitude is barely noticeable visually. Both stars rotate faster than their mutual orbital period. This lack of synchronization and the high ellipticity of their orbit may indicate that this is a young star system. Over time, the mutual tidal interaction of the pair may lead to rotational synchronization and orbit circularization.

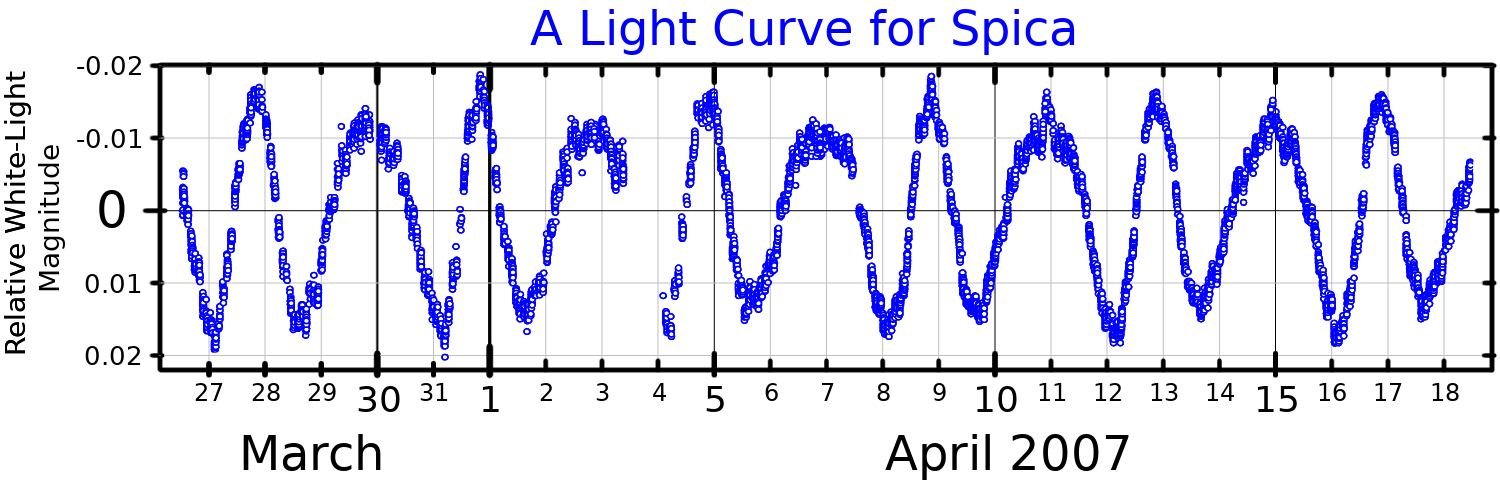
A light curve for Spica, adapted from Tkachenko et al. (2016)

Spica is a polarimetric variable, first discovered to be such in 2016. The majority of the polarimetric signal is the result of the reflection of the light from one star off the other (and vice versa). The two stars in Spica were the first ever to have their reflectivity (or geometric albedo) measured. The geometric albedos of Spica A and B are, respectively, 3.61 percent and 1.36 percent, values that are low compared to planets.

The MK spectral classification of Spica is typically considered to be an early B-type main-sequence star. Individual spectral types for the two components are difficult to assign accurately, especially for the secondary due to the Struve–Sahade effect. The Bright Star Catalogue listed a spectral class of B1III-IV for the primary and B2V for the secondary, but later studies have given various different values.

The primary star has a stellar classification of B1III-IV. The luminosity class matches the spectrum of a star that is midway between a subgiant and a giant star, and it is no longer a main-sequence star. The evolutionary stage has been calculated to be near or slightly past the end of the main-sequence phase. This is a massive star with more than 10 times the mass of the Sun and seven times its radius. The bolometric luminosity of the primary is about 20,500 times that of the Sun, and nine times the luminosity of its companion. The primary is one of the nearest stars to the Sun that has enough mass to end its life in a Type II supernova explosion. Since Spica has only recently left the main sequence, this event is not likely to occur for several more million years.

The primary is classified as a Beta Cephei variable star that varies in brightness over a 0.1738-day period. The spectrum shows a radial velocity variation with the same period, indicating that the surface of the star is regularly pulsating outward and then contracting. This star is rotating rapidly, with a rotational velocity of 199 km/s along the equator.

The secondary member of this system is one of the few stars whose spectrum is affected by the Struve–Sahade effect. This is an anomalous change in the strength of the spectral lines over the course of an orbit, where the lines become weaker as the star is moving away from the observer. It may be caused by a strong stellar wind from the primary scattering the light from secondary when it is receding. This star is smaller than the primary, with about 4 times the mass of the Sun and 3.6 times the Sun's radius. Its stellar classification is B4-7 V, making this a main-sequence star.

The third member of the system, orbiting the inner pair in a circumbinary configuration, was discovered in 2026 using interferometry from the GRAVITY instrument aboard the Very Large Telescope. The companion was found at an angular separation of 0.111″ (111 mas), implying a projected separation of 8.9 au at the system's distance. The star is estimated to have a mass of 1.4 M_{☉} and its orbit remain undetermined. The projected separation, if close to the orbital semi-major axis, would result in an orbital period of roughly six years in Kepler's third law. The companion is designated Alpha Virginis Ac, and the discovery paper has nicknamed it as Arista: Since Spica represents the ear of the wheat in the Virgo constellation, it would be the awn of the wheat's ear.

An expansive faint ultraviolet cloud and H II region designated as the Alpha Virginis Nebula (or Spica Nebula) was first reported by John E. Kupperian Jr., Albert Boggess III, and James E. Milligan. Based on an isophotal map, this nebula seem to be roughly circular in shape measuring 22° diameter. Observations indicate that the nebula increases in brightness from the outside towards Spica. The nebula is produced by ultraviolet radiation emanating from Spica, this creates a very photoionized environment.

== See also ==
- Lists of astronomical objects
