= WR 140 =

Star in the constellation of Cygnus

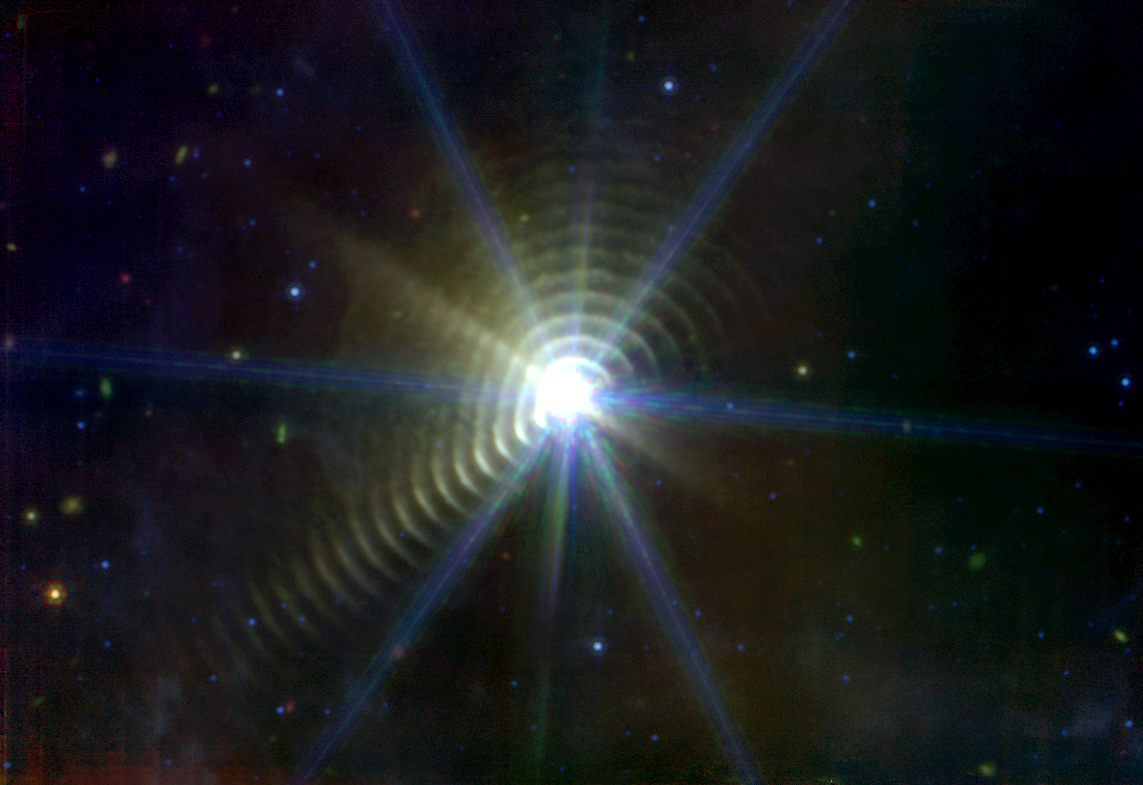
- This July 2022 image by the James Webb Space Telescope's Mid-Infrared Instrument shows WR 140 and its nebula.

Observation data Epoch J2000.0 Equinox J2000.0
- Constellation: Cygnus
- Right ascension: 20^{h} 20^{m} 27.97608^{s}
- Declination: +43° 51′ 16.2802″
- Apparent magnitude (V): 6.85

Characteristics
- Spectral type: WC7pd + O5.5fc
- Apparent magnitude (J): 5.547
- Apparent magnitude (K): 5.037
- U−B color index: −0.35
- B−V color index: +0.40
- Variable type: WR

Astrometry
Radial velocity (R_{v})	3.10 km/s
Proper motion (μ)	RA: −4.275±0.027 mas/yr Dec.: −1.874±0.026 mas/yr
Parallax (π)	0.5378±0.0237 mas
Distance	1,518±21 pc
Absolute magnitude (M_{V})	WR: −6.6 to −4.8; O: −6.11 to −5.94

Orbit
Primary	O
Name	WR
Period (P)	2,895.00±0.29 d
Semi-major axis (a)	0.008922±0.000067" (13.55±0.21 au)
Eccentricity (e)	0.8993±0.0013
Inclination (i)	119.07±0.88°
Longitude of the node (Ω)	353.87±0.67°
Periastron epoch (T)	MJD 60,636.23±0.53
Argument of periastron (ω) (secondary)	227.44±0.52°
Semi-amplitude (K_{1}) (primary)	26.50±0.48 km/s
Semi-amplitude (K_{2}) (secondary)	−75.25±0.63 km/s

Details

WR
Mass	10.31±0.45 M_{☉}
Luminosity	537,000 L_{☉}
Temperature	70,000 K

O
Mass	29.27±1.14 M_{☉}
Radius	35 R_{☉}
Luminosity	1.6 million L_{☉}
Temperature	35,000 K

Other designations
- V1687 Cygni, BD+43°3571, HD 193793, HIP 100287, TYC 3164-1678-1, SBC9 1232, WDS J20205+4351, 2MASS J20202798+4351164

Database references
SIMBAD	data

WR 140 is a spectroscopic binary containing an O-type star and a Wolf–Rayet star. It is located in the constellation of Cygnus, lying in the sky at the centre of the triangle formed by Deneb, γ Cygni and δ Cygni.

== Significance ==
WR 140 is thought to be a prototypical example of cosmic dust production. In this mode of cosmic dust production, detritus enriched in silicon and carbon is periodically blown into the wider universe by certain stars toward the end of their lives. Such stars are termed Wolf–Rayets.

The outermost layers of a Wolf–Rayet star are enriched in oxygen, nitrogen, silicon and carbon. Indeed, the spectrographic presence of these elements, along with a notable absence of hydrogen, were one of the original diagnostic criteria for classifying a star as Wolf–Rayet. It is these enriched layers of the photosphere that are lost in repeating pulses. Once distant from the surface, the carbon fraction of this ejected material begins to glow at approximately 1,000 K. The heating is due to the star's UV radiation, the wavelength of its greatest luminosity. This has the effect of rebroadcasting the star's UV radiation in the infrared, which can be detected by suitable telescopes, such as the James Webb Space Telescope. The rebroadcast of the star's UV radiation by carbon and other metals traveling away from its surface creates the Doppler signature of a Wolf–Rayet—broad emission lines—rather than the far more common absorption-line spectra.

== Binary system characteristics ==
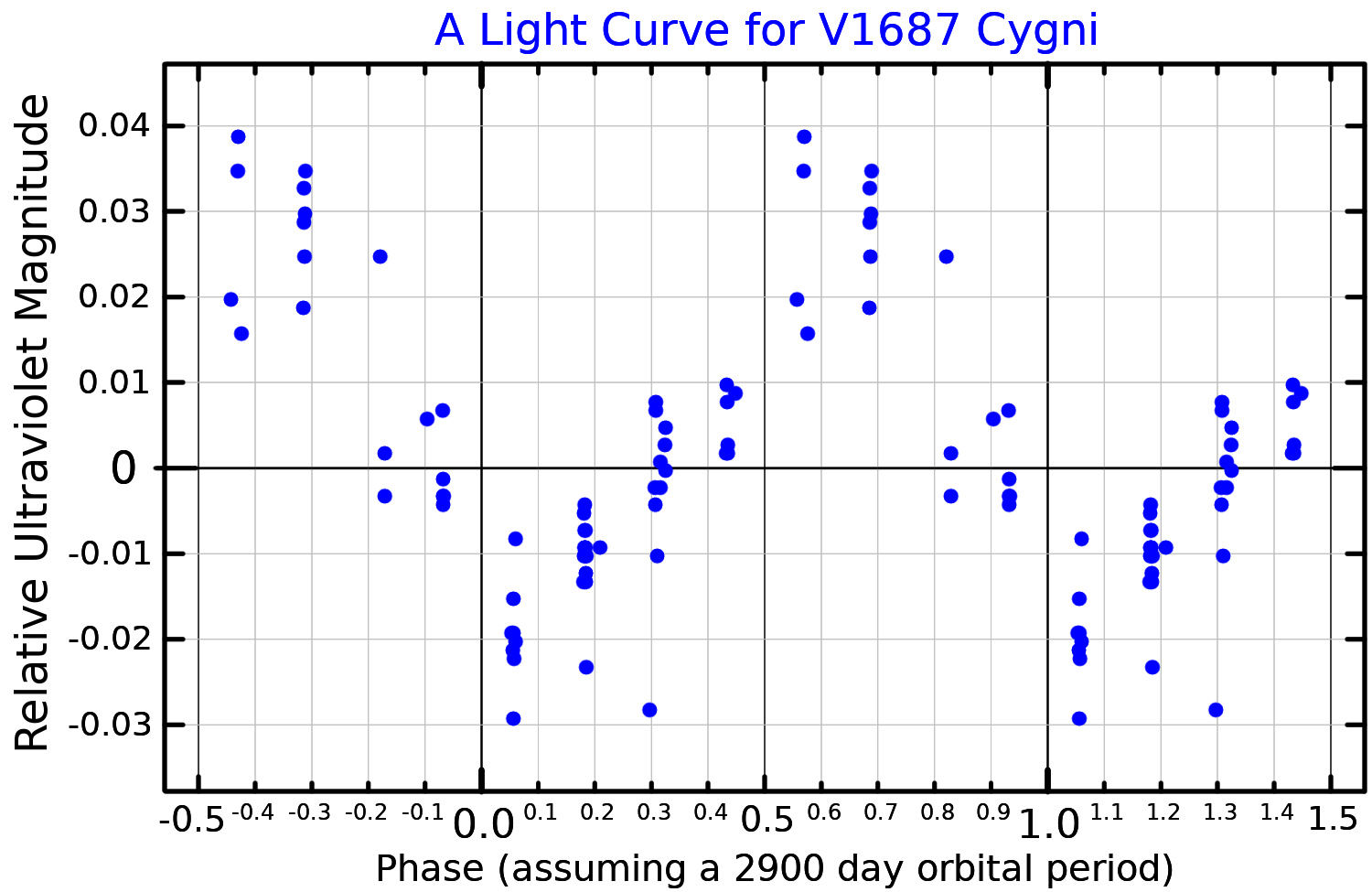
An ultraviolet band light curve for V1687 Cygni, plotted from data published by Panov et al. (2000)

WR 140 has been described as the brightest Wolf–Rayet star in the northern hemisphere, although WR 133 also in Cygnus is comparably bright. Being less massive, less luminous, and probably less visually bright than its primary, the Wolf–Rayet component is often identified as the secondary star, despite the fact that it dominates the spectrum with its broad emission lines. Or the components may be identified only as WR and O for clarity. The primary star is an O4–5 star, most likely a giant or supergiant. Fahed et al. deduced a spectral type of O5.5fc, with a luminousity class between III and I. This classification is commonly used for this star.

The currently-accepted spectroscopic orbit is highly eccentric and has a period of 7.9±0.2 years, which has been determined from the velocity variations observed with the component's spectral lines, mostly from the Balmer absorption lines of the O4–5 primary and C IV emission lines at 465.0 nm for WR 140. Separation between the two stars varies from 1.3 AU at periastron to 23.9 AU at apastron. WR 140 is listed as a Wolf–Rayet variable star whose visual brightness varies very slightly, and it has been given the variable star designation V1687 Cyg in the General Catalogue of Variable Stars. Infrared light fluctuations during the orbit of WR 140 are studied because of its episodic dust formation. It is now regarded as the prototype colliding-wind binary. Shortly after periastron passage every eight years, the infrared brightness increases dramatically and then slowly drops again over a period of months. Here stellar winds collide with the dust formation created by the Wolf–Rayet star, causing the unusual bulges and angles in the concentric shells of dust. The dust typically emitted by Wolf–Rayet systems is not so coherent or concentric as those of WR 140.

The dust lanes around Wolf–Rayet stars are most commonly observed as some variety of spiral. This is thought to be the result of the duelling stellar winds in binary systems, which compress clouds of dust into distinct shock fronts. The concentric nature of WR 140's dust shells is not well understood, although it may be related to nuclear processes in the Wolf–Rayet star's core.

== Dust shells ==
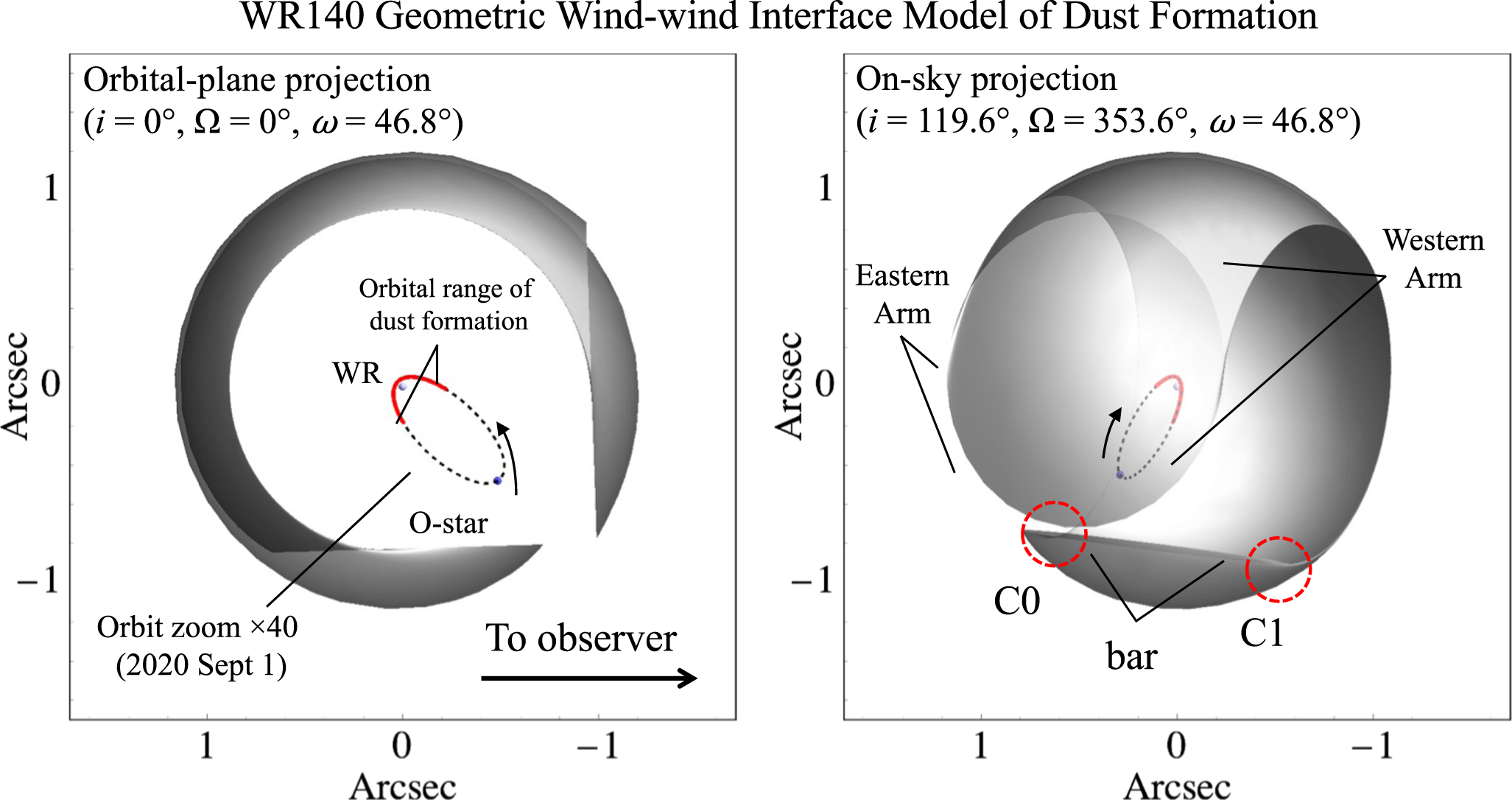
Model describing the dust formation around WR 140, figure published by Lau et al. 2023

The dust shells around WR 140 were first observed in 1999/2001 with the Keck Observatory. Ground-based infrared observations only resolved one to two discrete shells around the binary. Over 17 shells were observed with JWST MIRI, reaching out to about 45 arcseconds, or 70,000 astronomical units (AU). These represent more than 130 years of episodic dust production. A bright dust feature known as C1 has been used to analyse the mid-infrared spectrum of the shells; these shells show emission, probably due to polycyclic aromatic hydrocarbons (PAH), which is known to be highly stable. These features indicate hydrogen-poor and carbon-rich dust particles.

Multi-epoch observations with Keck showed that the dust shells are accelerating under radiation pressure. When the grains first form at a distance of approximately 50 AU from the star they have a speed of 1,810+140
−170 km/s. They then experience an acceleration of 900+700
−400 km/s per year until they reach around 220 AU, the dust becomes optically thin and the acceleration decreases. With the help of Subaru and Keck, the shells were detected in the mid- and near-infrared. The mid-infrared detection corresponds to colder (500 K) larger dust grains (30 to 50 nm) and the near-infrared detection corresponds to hotter (1,000 K) nano-sized dust (1 nm). These nano-sized dust grains exist in excess and are either produced by grain-grain collision or by radiative torque disruption (RATD).

== Mechanism of dust production ==
While interactions between the stellar winds of the two stars of WR 140 may be responsible for concentrating dust into discrete bands, it is not known how the concentric shells are formed. It is thought that nuclear processes in the Wolf–Rayet star may contribute an unusual degree of coherence to dust emissions.

As the Wolf–Rayet star in WR 140 neared the end of its short life its core ran out of hydrogen to fuse into helium. With the loss of the radiation pressure this fusion provided, the balance that determines the radii of all stars shifted decisively towards gravitational collapse. The Wolf–Rayet star began to lose volume as its own gravitational contraction compacted its cooler interior. This collapse eventually began to slow as it grew more intense and heated the star's interior. Along the edge of the core a thin shell experienced temperatures and pressures sufficient to begin helium fusion. This helium burning provided a burst of radiation pressure that propagated through the star, up to its surface. The star began to inflate, though this increase in size was only temporary. The thin shell of helium fusion eventually caused enough expansion to moderate, or even extinguish its own reaction. The star once again began to collapse. However, at the surface this loss of internal radiation pressure had the effect of blowing the outermost layers of the star's photosphere into space. Following this, the star began to fuse helium at a greater rate and temporarily regained its former radiation pressure. This helium fusion once again stalled, and the subsequent gravitational collapse dislodged another layer of photosphere into space. These pulses will continue as long as this cycle of intermittent helium fusion can repeat itself.

The cast-off materials are essentially extremely large injections of cosmic dust into the star's stellar wind, which then carries it away from the star at several hundred kilometers per second. It is not well understood whether the unusual concentricity of WR 140's dust is due to interactions between the two stellar winds or is the result of nuclear processes in the Wolf–Rayet member itself.

The high surface temperature of Wolf–Rayet stars (up to 210,000 K) produces intense ultraviolet radiation, enough to make 20 or more layers of dust visible to instrumentation. The distance between the concentric shells of ejected material corresponds to the time between one faltering of the star's helium burning and another. This period is close to eight years, with new emissions having been observed in 1985, 1993, 2001 and 2009. One estimate places the distance between shells at around 1.4 trillion km, meaning that if the Sun were such a Wolf–Rayet star one shell would be well into the Oort cloud and around 5% of the way to Alpha Centauri before another shell were cast off. As seen in the JWST image at top right these intervals can be highly stable, continuing over many decades or hundreds of years.
