= Superwind =

Dense stellar wind

A superwind is an extremely dense wind emanating from asymptotic giant branch (AGB) stars towards the end of their lives. While the exact origin of the superwind is unknown, it is believed that it causes the AGB star to appear as an OH/IR star. At the latest stages of the star's life, an AGB star can lose around $10^{-4}$ solar masses per year to the superwind. This mass loss is so high that it causes nuclear fusion in AGB stars to be extinguished earlier than was predicted in early theories. After nuclear fusion has ceased, the star becomes a white dwarf, and the dense wind envelope becomes its planetary nebula.

== See also ==
- Cosmic wind
- Solar wind
- Stellar wind
- Planetary wind
- Stellar-wind bubble
- Colliding-wind binary
- Pulsar wind nebula
- Galactic superwind
