= Colliding-wind binary =

Binary star system in which two massive stars emit powerful stellar winds

A colliding-wind binary is a binary star system in which the two members are massive stars that emit powerful, radiatively-driven stellar winds. The location where these two winds collide produces a strong shock front that can cause radio, X-ray and possibly synchrotron radiation emission. Wind compression in the bow shock region between the two stellar winds allows dust formation. When this dust streams away from the orbiting pair, it can form a pinwheel nebula of spiraling dust. Such pinwheels have been observed in the Quintuplet Cluster.

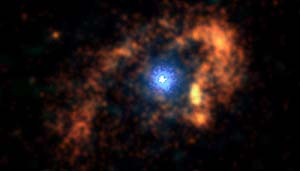
A composite optical/x-ray image of Eta Carinae and its surrounding nebula taken by the Chandra X-ray Observatory and the Hubble Space Telescope. The blue inner part of the nebula is optical emission, powered by the collision of winds from Eta Carinae and its unseen companion. Credit: Chandra Science Center and NASA.

The archetype of such a colliding-wind binary system is WR 140 (HD 193793), which consists of a 20 solar mass (M_{☉}) Wolf-Rayet star orbiting about a 50 M_{☉}, spectral class O4–5 main sequence star every 7.9 years. The high orbital eccentricity of the pair allows astronomers to observe changes in the colliding wind region as their separation varies. Another prominent example of a colliding-wind binary is thought to be Eta Carinae, one of the most luminous objects in the Milky Way galaxy. The first colliding-wind binary to be detected in the X-ray band outside the Milky Way galaxy was HD 5980, located in the Small Magellanic Cloud.

== See also ==
- Struve-Sahade effect
- Cosmic wind
- Stellar wind
- Solar wind
- Planetary wind
- Stellar-wind bubble
- Pulsar wind nebula
- Galactic superwind
- Superwind
