= SDSS J113706.18−033737.1 =

Dwarf starburst galaxy

Observation data (J2000 epoch)
- Constellation: Leo
- Right ascension: 11^{h} 37^{m} 06.1965^{s}
- Declination: −03° 37′ 37.296″

Characteristics
- Type: Dwarf galaxy
- Mass: 100 million M_{☉}
- Notable features: A starburst galaxy with the pulsar wind nebula VT 1137−0337

Other designations
- PGC 125758, LEDA 125758, LCRS B113432.8−032101, NSA 3048

SDSS J113706.18−033737.1 (PGC 125758) is a dwarf starburst galaxy with a mass of 100 million times the mass of the sun. This galaxy is located 395 million light years away from earth. It is currently undergoing a burst of stellar formation forming 0.5 solar masses a year.
