= T Tauri wind =

The T Tauri wind — so named because of the young star currently in this stage—is a phenomenon indicative of the phase of stellar development between the accretion of material from the slowing rotating material of a solar nebula and the ignition of the hydrogen that has agglomerated into the protostar.

The protostar at first only has about 1% of its final mass. But the envelope of the star continues to grow as infalling material is accreted. After 10,000–100,000 years, thermonuclear fusion begins in its core, then a strong stellar wind is produced which stops the infall of new mass. The protostar is now considered a young star since its mass is fixed, and its future evolution is now set.

== The evolutionary picture of low mass protostars ==
Initially there is a random amount of interstellar gaseous matter, mainly hydrogen, containing traces of dusts (ices, carbon, rocks).

The T Tauri stars, with masses less than twice the mass of the Sun, are thought to follow this process:

1. initially, the clouds which collapse are thought to be very slowly rotating
2. The dense cores collapse faster than the less dense outer regions of the cloud. This follows from the free-fall time ~ 1/√(gxdensity). The initial collapse of the core is quite fast; time ~ 1/√(6.7×10^{−8}×10^{−18} g/cm^{3}) ~ 50,000–100,000 years or so. The lower density envelope takes longer to collapse accrete (collapse onto the protostar); time ~ millions of years or so. Roughly speaking, the Sun forms as shown here.
3. The inside-out collapse leads to the formation of the forming star in the center of the cloud which then slowly builds up its mass by accreting the outer layers of the cloud.
4. Another noteworthy aspect of this later stage of formation is that before the star actually gets hot enough to ignite nuclear fusion, an intense stellar wind is generated. Often because the cloud was slowly rotating, a disk of material forms around the star. The disk collimates the intense stellar wind into 2 oppositely directed beams producing what is referred to as a bipolar flow, which can cause the forming star to lose up to 0.4 mass of the Sun, and can start to disrupt the cloud.
5. Even though it takes several millions of years for the cloud to accrete onto the protostar, because the protostars are relatively low mass, it takes even longer to slowly contract and approach starhood. For the most part, the cloud has a chance to accrete onto the protostar before the violent stages of evolution begin.

== The character of accretion and stellar wind parameters of T Tauri stars ==
The main portion of emission continuum of Classic T Tauri Stars is formed outside the accretion shock, what means a great deal of accretion matter falls onto the star in nearly horizontal direction. This gas decelerate in turbulent layer near the star surface.

We suggest two scenarios to explain such nature of accretion: two-stream accretion (through boundary layer and magnetosphere) and magnetospheric accretion by way of streams, the bulk of matter in which falls onto the star in nearly horizontal direction.

Observations have provided quantitative parameters of disk wind, derived from the analysis of optical and UV spectra of CTTS. The matter outflows observed from a disk region with an outer radius of < 0.5 AU. The outflowing matter initially moves almost along the disk until being accelerated up to V > 100 km/s and only afterwards begins to collimate. Inner region of the wind is collimated into the jet at a distance <3 AU from the disk mid plain. The V_{z} gas velocity component in the jet decreases with increasing distance from the jet axis. The gas temperature in the jet bottom is less than 20,000 kelvins.
