= NGC 6871 =

Open cluster in the constellation Cygnus

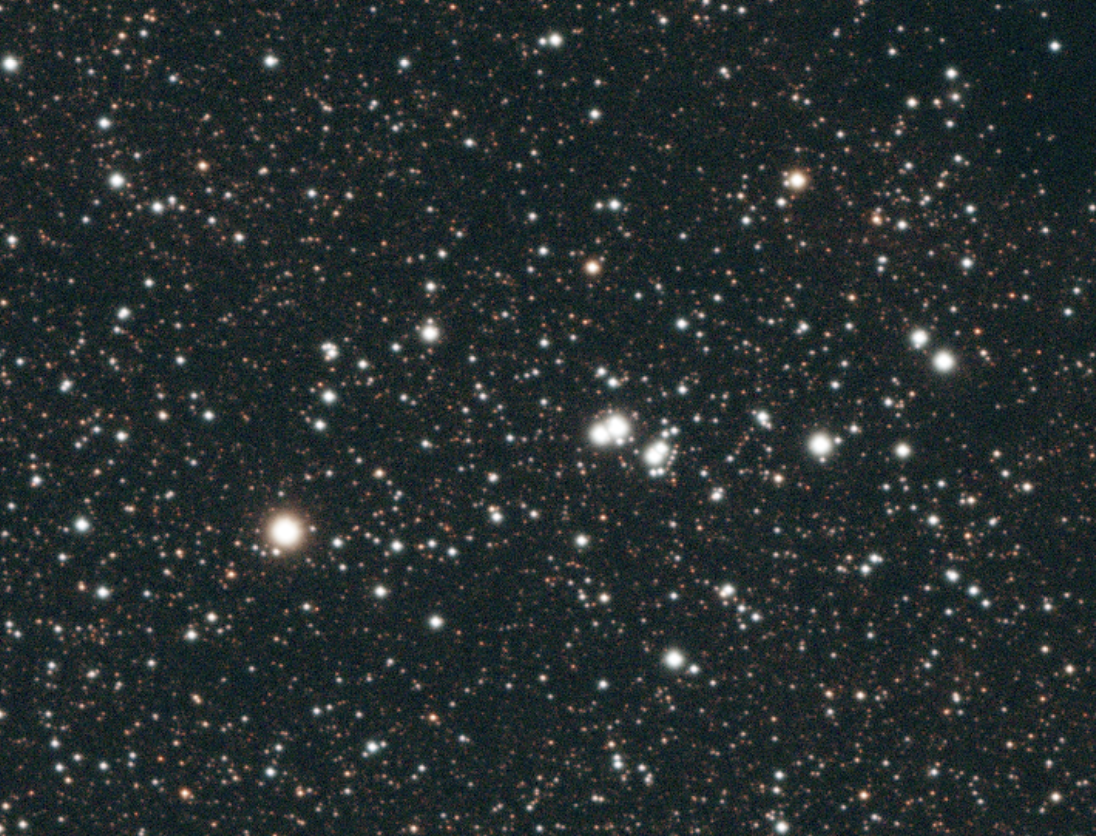
- NGC 6871, imaged in 2026

Observation data (J2000 epoch)
- Right ascension: 20^{h} 05^{m} 59^{s}
- Declination: +35° 46.6′
- Distance: 5,133 ly (1,574 pc)
- Apparent magnitude (V): 5.2

Physical characteristics
- Estimated age: 9.1 million years
- Presence of eclipsing binary stars
- Other designations: GC 4548, h 2067, Struve 2630

Associations
- Constellation: Cygnus

NGC 6871 is a small, young open cluster in the constellation of Cygnus. The cluster has fewer than 50 members, most of which are blue and white stars. It is located 5135 light-years from Earth.

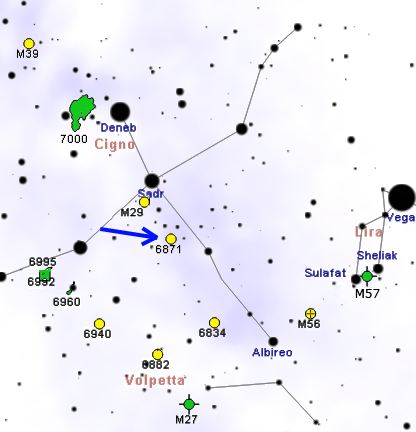
Map showing location of NGC 6871

NGC 6871 was born in the same giant molecular cloud with at least six other open clusters. The other open clusters are not gravitationally associated with NGC 6871. NGC 6871 itself also seems to be disintegrating.

Prominent stars
Star name	Effective temperature	Absolute magnitude	Bolometric magnitude	Mass (M_{☉})	Spectral type	Ref.
HD 226868	33,000	-6.4	-9.6	40	O9.7I	
HD 191201	31,600	-5.8	-8.9	35	B0V	
HD 190919	26,300	-5.8	-8.3	25	B1Ib	
BD+35 3955	26,300	-5.7	-8.3	24	B1Ib	
HD 190864	39,900	-5.5	-9.3	45	O7III	
ADS 13374 B (WR 133 B)	30,000	-5.4	-8.49	22.6	O9.5I	
HD 227634	29,500	-5.3	-8.2	25	B0.2III	
HD 227018	41,000	-4.9	-8.8	38	O7V	
WR 133 A	70,800	-3.4	-8.81	9.3	WN5o	
