= Galactic superwind =

Strong stellar winds of a galactic scale in size

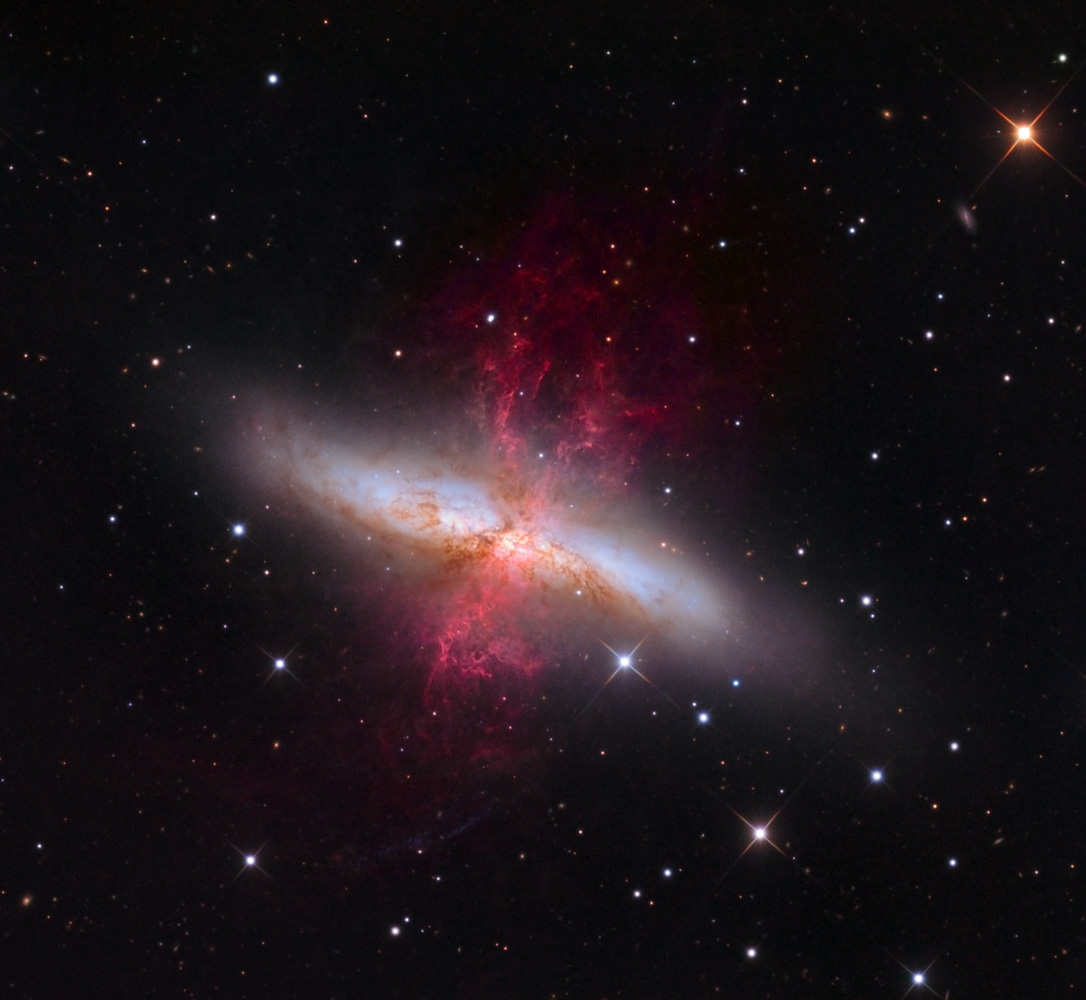
M82, a starburst galaxy often referred to as the "Cigar Galaxy", is thought to exhibit strong superwinds.

A galactic superwind, or just galactic wind, is a high velocity stellar wind emanating from either newly formed massive stars, spiral density waves, or as the result of the effects of supermassive black holes. They are normally observed in starburst galaxies.

== Description ==
Galactic winds are strong stellar winds made up of charged particles, ejecta, and varying amounts of hot and cool gas, interacting with enough force that the ejecta's kinetic energy is converted to thermal energy. The resulting effect is a massive gust of rapidly expanding super-heated gases that can span the length of a galaxy. In galaxies with active galactic nuclei, galactic winds can also be driven by the effects of super-massive black holes.

Galactic winds are considered an important function in the evolution of a galaxy. The winds cause an outflow of gas and other material into the halo of a galaxy, while also facilitating the spread of metals around a galaxy. Galactic winds are also capable of blowing material out of a galaxy entirely and into the intergalactic medium.

=== Formation ===
Superwinds are theorized to form in compact starburst galaxies in which star growth is much higher than in other types of galaxies. This accelerated star growth results in more prevalent stellar winds being present in starburst galaxies. Superwinds form when ejecta released either by supernovae or stellar winds collide with such force that the shock from the impact converts the kinetic energy of the ejecta into thermal energy. The violent conversion from kinetic to thermal energy prevents a significant amount of energy from being radiated away. This in turn creates an incredibly hot bubble of gas that is under much greater pressure than it surroundings are. Eventually the gas bubble will expand to encompass other particles of ejected gases, further increasing the force and size of its expansion. This "snowplow" effect results in a gust of stellar wind and gas that can span the width of a galaxy. It has been theorized that superwinds can potentially be traveling at a velocity of several thousand kilometers per second by the time they enter the intergalactic medium.

== See also ==
- Cosmic wind
- Stellar wind
- Solar wind
- Planetary wind
- Stellar-wind bubble
- Colliding-wind binary
- Pulsar wind nebula
- Superwind
