= NGC 3206 =

Galaxy in the constellation Ursa Major

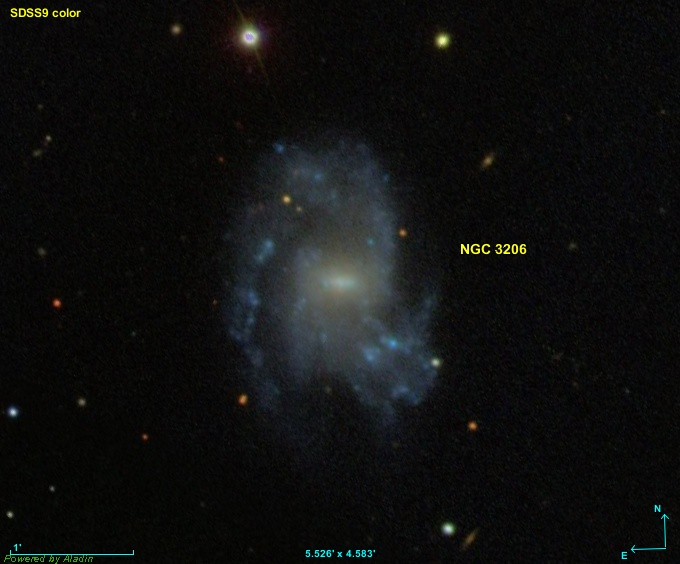
- NGC 3206 imaged by SDSS

Observation data (J2000 epoch)
- Constellation: Ursa Major
- Right ascension: 10^{h} 21^{m} 47.5192^{s}
- Declination: +56° 55′ 49.404″
- Redshift: 0.003839
- Heliocentric radial velocity: 1151 ± 1 km/s
- Distance: 63.0 ± 4.4 Mly (19.31 ± 1.36 Mpc)
- Group or cluster: NGC 3264 Group (LGG 201)
- Apparent magnitude (V): 11.9

Characteristics
- Type: SB(s)cd
- Size: ~50,000 ly (15.34 kpc) (estimated)
- Apparent size (V): 2.9′ × 1.9′

Other designations
- IRAS 10184+5710, 2MASX J10214758+5655494, UGC 5589, MCG +10-15-069, PGC 30322, CGCG 290-030

NGC 3206 is a barred spiral galaxy in the constellation of Ursa Major. Its velocity with respect to the cosmic microwave background is 1309 ± 11 km/s, which corresponds to a Hubble distance of 19.31 ± 1.36 Mpc (~63 million light-years). In addition, 11 non redshift measurements give a distance of 17.582 ± 1.088 Mpc (~57.3 million light-years). The galaxy was discovered by German-British astronomer William Herschel on 8 April 1793.

According to the SIMBAD database, NGC 3206 is an Active Galaxy Nucleus Candidate, i.e. it has a compact region at the center of a galaxy that emits a significant amount of energy across the electromagnetic spectrum, with characteristics indicating that this luminosity is not produced by the stars.

== NGC 3264 Group ==
NGC 3206 is part of the NGC 3264 group (also known as LGG 201), which includes at least five other members: NGC 3220, NGC 3264, NGC 3353, UGC 5848, and UGCA 211.

== Supernova ==
One supernova has been observed in NGC 3206: American amateur astronomer Patrick Wiggins discovered SN 2024bch (Type II, mag. 16.1) on 29 January 2024. Later analysis suggested that the supernova was Type IIn-L with a red supergiant progenitor.

== See also ==
- List of NGC objects (3001–4000)
