= Stellar wind =

Flow of gas ejected from the upper atmosphere of a star

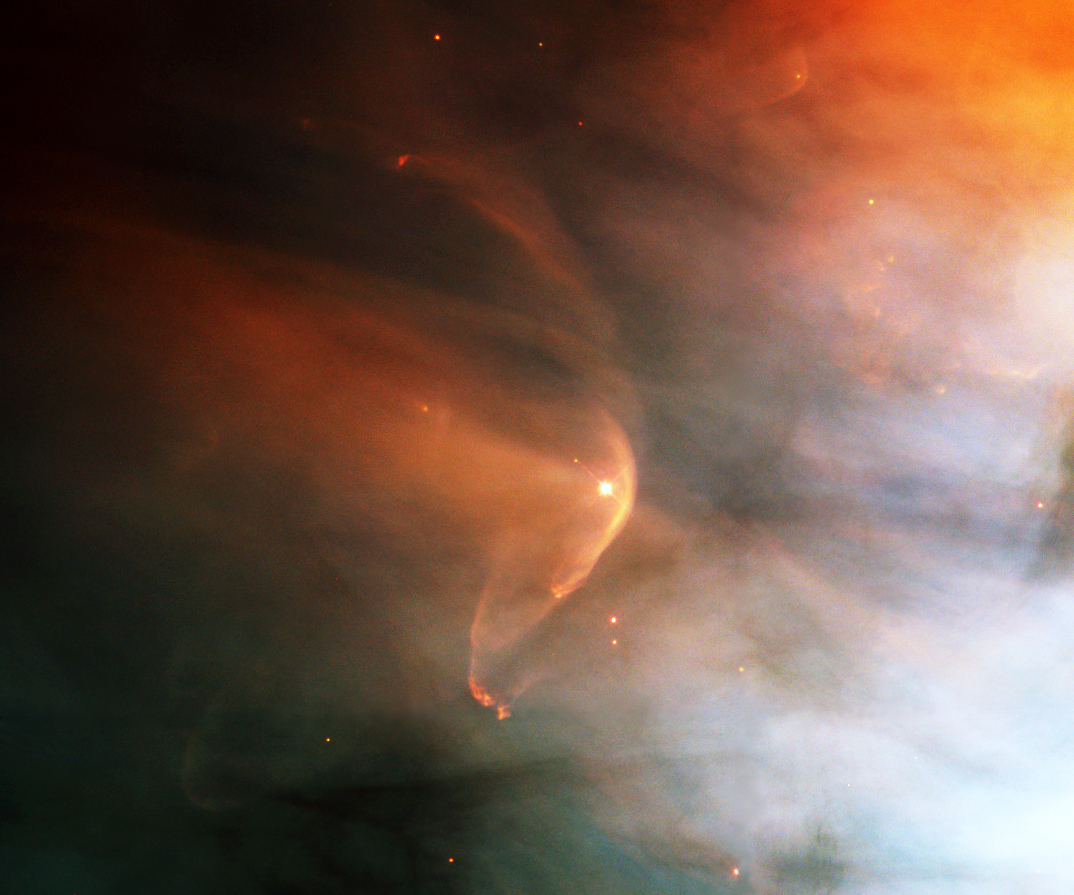
This image shows the wind from the star LL Orionis generating a bow shock (the bright arc) as it collides with material in the surrounding Orion Nebula.

A stellar wind is a flow of gas ejected from the upper atmosphere of a star. It is distinguished from the bipolar outflows characteristic of young stars by being less collimated, although stellar winds are not generally spherically symmetric.

Different types of stars have different types of stellar winds.

Post-main-sequence stars nearing the ends of their lives often eject large quantities of mass in massive ($\scriptstyle \dot{M} > 10^{-3}$ solar masses per year), slow (v = 10 km/s) winds. These include red giants and supergiants, and asymptotic giant branch stars. These winds are understood to be driven by radiation pressure on dust condensing in the upper atmosphere of the stars.

Young T Tauri stars often have very powerful stellar winds.

Massive stars of types O and B have stellar winds with lower mass loss rates ($\scriptstyle \dot{M} < 10^{-6}$ solar masses per year) but very high velocities (v > 1–2000 km/s). Such winds are driven by radiation pressure on the resonance absorption lines of heavy elements such as carbon and nitrogen. These high-energy stellar winds blow stellar wind bubbles.

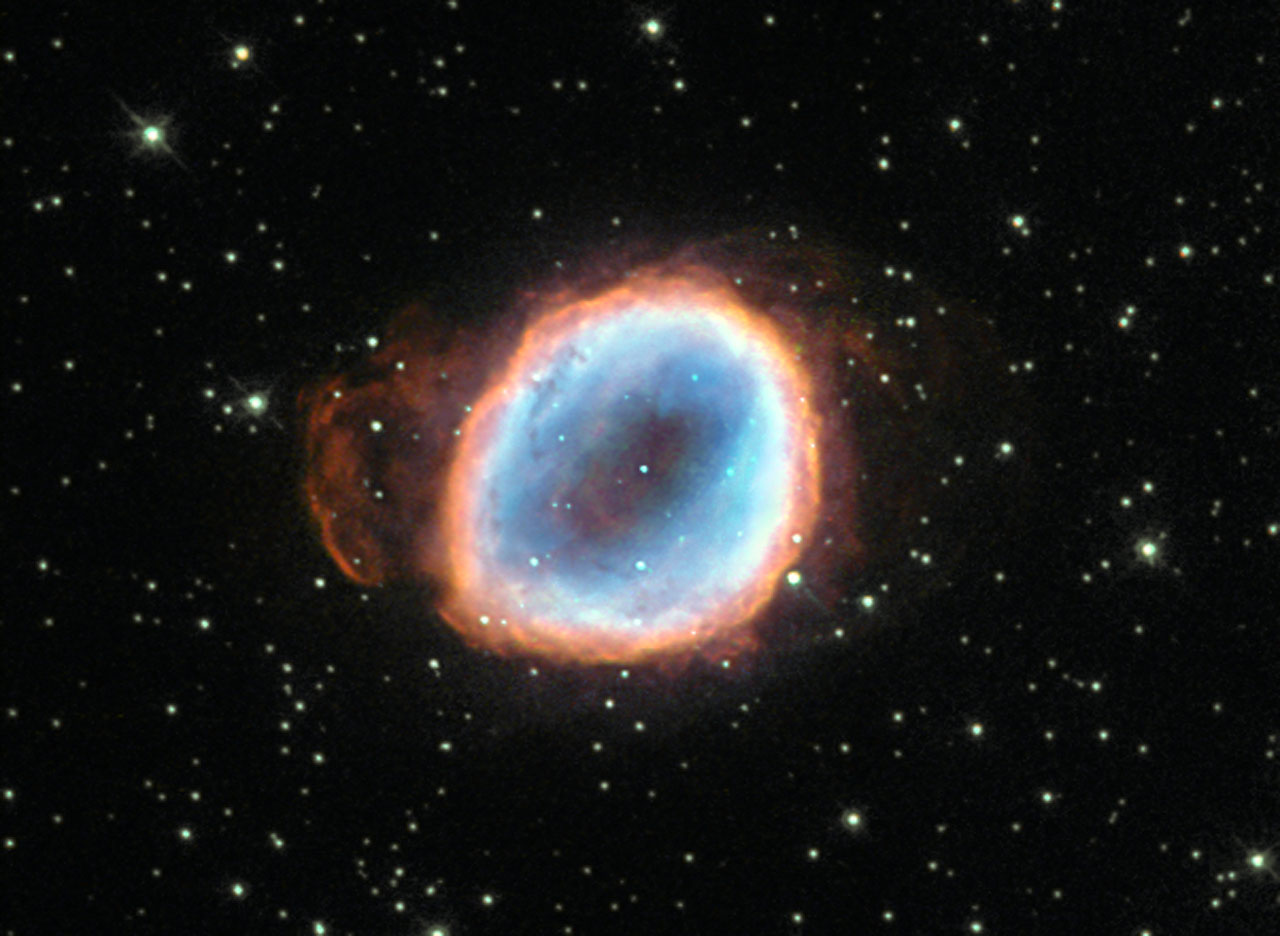
In planetary nebula NGC 6565, a cloud of gas was ejected from the star after strong stellar winds.

G-type stars like the Sun have a wind driven by their hot, magnetized corona. The Sun's wind is called the solar wind. These winds consist mostly of high-energy electrons and protons (about 1 keV) that are able to escape the star's gravity because of the high temperature of the corona.

Stellar winds from main-sequence stars do not strongly influence the evolution of lower-mass stars such as the Sun. However, for more massive stars such as O stars, the mass loss can result in a star shedding as much as 50% of its mass whilst on the main sequence: this clearly has a significant impact on the later stages of evolution. The influence can even be seen for intermediate mass stars, which will become white dwarfs at the ends of their lives rather than exploding as supernovae only because they lost enough mass in their winds.

== See also ==
- Cosmic ray
- Cosmic wind
- Planetary wind
- Colliding-wind binary
- Pulsar wind nebula
- Galactic superwind
- Superwind
- Planetary nebula
- Asymptotic giant branch
