= NGC 3353 =

Galaxy in the constellation Ursa Major

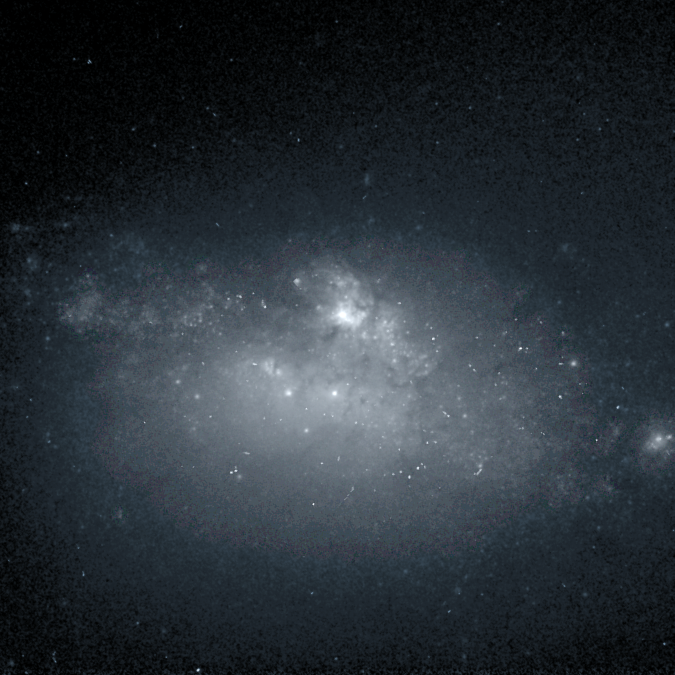
- NGC 3353 imaged by the Hubble Space Telescope

Observation data (J2000 epoch)
- Constellation: Ursa Major
- Right ascension: 10^{h} 45^{m} 22.296^{s}
- Declination: +55° 57′ 39.24″
- Redshift: 0.003139
- Heliocentric radial velocity: 941 ± 1 km/s
- Distance: 53.3 ± 3.8 Mly (16.35 ± 1.16 Mpc)
- Group or cluster: NGC 3264 Group (LGG 201)
- Apparent magnitude (V): 12.8

Characteristics
- Type: Sb? pec
- Size: ~27,300 ly (8.36 kpc) (estimated)

Other designations
- IRAS 10422+5613, UGC 5860, MCG +09-18-022, Mrk 35, PGC 32103, CGCG 267-009

NGC 3353 is an intermediate spiral galaxy located in the constellation of Ursa Major. Its velocity with respect to the cosmic microwave background is 1108 ± 12 km/s, which corresponds to a Hubble distance of 53.3 ± 3.8 Mly (16.35 ± 1.16 Mpc). In addition, four non-redshift measurements give a distance of 62.46 ± 2.66 Mly (19.150 ± 0.817 Mpc). NGC 3353 was discovered on March 18, 1790, by William Herschel, a German born British astronomer.

NGC 3353 is a galaxy whose nucleus shines in the ultraviolet range. It is listed in the Markarian catalogue as Mrk 35.

== NGC 3264 Group ==
NGC 3353 is part of the NGC 3264 group (also known as LGG 201), which includes at least five other members: NGC 3206, NGC 3220, NGC 3264, UGC 5848, and UGCA 211.

== See also ==
- List of NGC objects (3001–4000)
