= Pulsar wind nebula =

Nebula powered by the pulsar wind of a pulsar

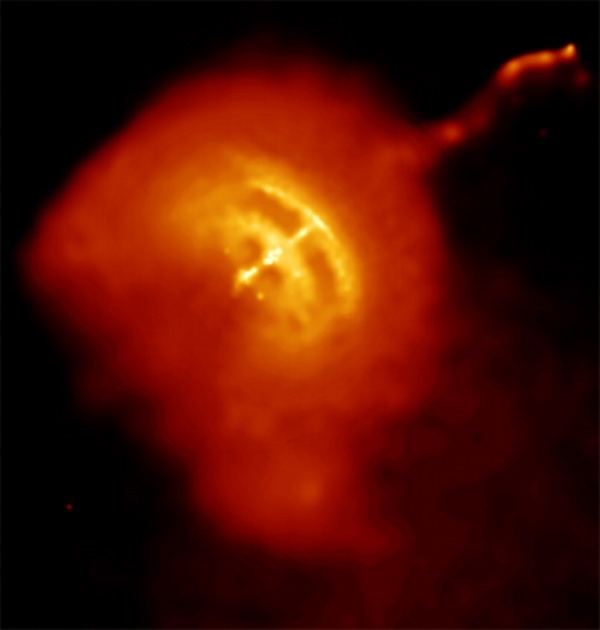
The Vela Pulsar (centre) and its surrounding pulsar wind nebula

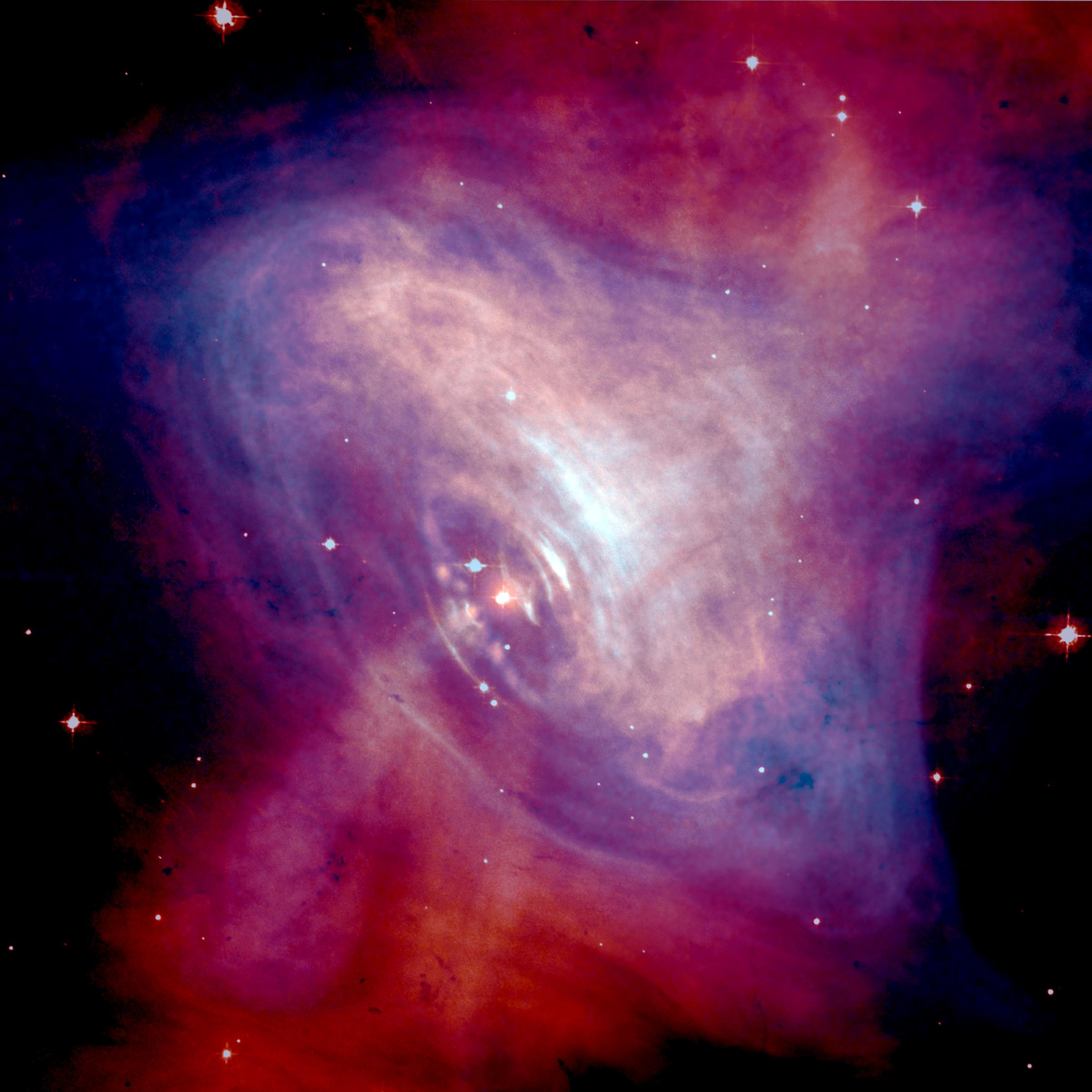
The inner Crab Nebula. Central part shows the pulsar wind nebula, with the red star in the centre being the Crab Pulsar. Image combines optical data from Hubble (in red) and X-ray data from Chandra (in blue).

A pulsar wind nebula (PWN, plural PWNe), sometimes called a plerion (derived from the Greek "πλήρης", pleres, meaning "full"), is a type of nebula sometimes found inside the shell of a supernova remnant (SNR), powered by winds generated by a central pulsar. These nebulae were proposed as a class in 1976 as enhancements at radio wavelengths inside supernova remnants. They have since been found to be infrared, optical, millimetre, X-ray and gamma ray sources.

== Evolution of pulsar wind nebulae ==
Pulsar wind nebulae evolve through various phases. New pulsar wind nebulae appear soon after a pulsar's creation, and typically sit inside a supernova remnant, for example the Crab Nebula, or the nebula within the large Vela Supernova Remnant. As the pulsar wind nebula ages, the supernova remnant dissipates and disappears. Over time, pulsar wind nebulae may become bow-shock nebulae surrounding millisecond or slowly rotating pulsars.

== Properties of pulsar wind nebulae ==
Pulsar winds are composed of charged particles (plasma) accelerated to relativistic speeds by the rapidly rotating, powerful magnetic fields above 1 teragauss (100 million teslas) that are generated by the spinning pulsar. The pulsar wind often streams into the surrounding interstellar medium, creating a standing shock wave called the 'wind termination shock', where the wind decelerates to sub-relativistic speed. Beyond this radius, synchrotron emission increases in the magnetized flow.

Pulsar wind nebulae often show the following properties:

- An increasing brightness towards the center, without a shell-like structure as seen in supernova remnants.
- A highly polarized flux and a flat spectral index in the radio band, α=0–0.3. The index steepens at X-ray energies due to synchrotron radiation losses and on the average has an X-ray photon index of 1.3–2.3 (spectral index of 2.3–3.3).
- An X-ray size that is generally smaller than their radio and optical size (due to smaller synchrotron lifetimes of the higher-energy electrons).
- A photon index at TeV gamma-ray energies of ~2.3.

Pulsar wind nebulae can be powerful probes of a pulsar/neutron star's interaction with its surroundings. Their unique properties can be used to infer the geometry, energetics, and composition of the pulsar wind, the space velocity of the pulsar itself, and the properties of the ambient medium.

== See also ==
- 3C 58
- G292.0+01.8
- Crab Nebula
- Cosmic wind
- Stellar wind
- Solar wind
- Planetary wind
- Stellar-wind bubble
- Colliding-wind binary
- Galactic superwind
- Superwind
- Orders of magnitude (magnetic field)
