= List of most massive stars =

This is a list of the most massive stars that have been discovered, in solar mass units (M_{☉}).

== Uncertainties and caveats ==
Most of the masses listed below are contested and, being the subject of current research, remain under review and subject to constant revision of their masses and other characteristics. Indeed, many of the masses listed in the table below are inferred from theory, using difficult measurements of the stars' temperatures, composition, and absolute magnitude. All the masses listed below are uncertain: Both the theory and the measurements are pushing the limits of current knowledge and technology. Both theories and measurements could be incorrect.

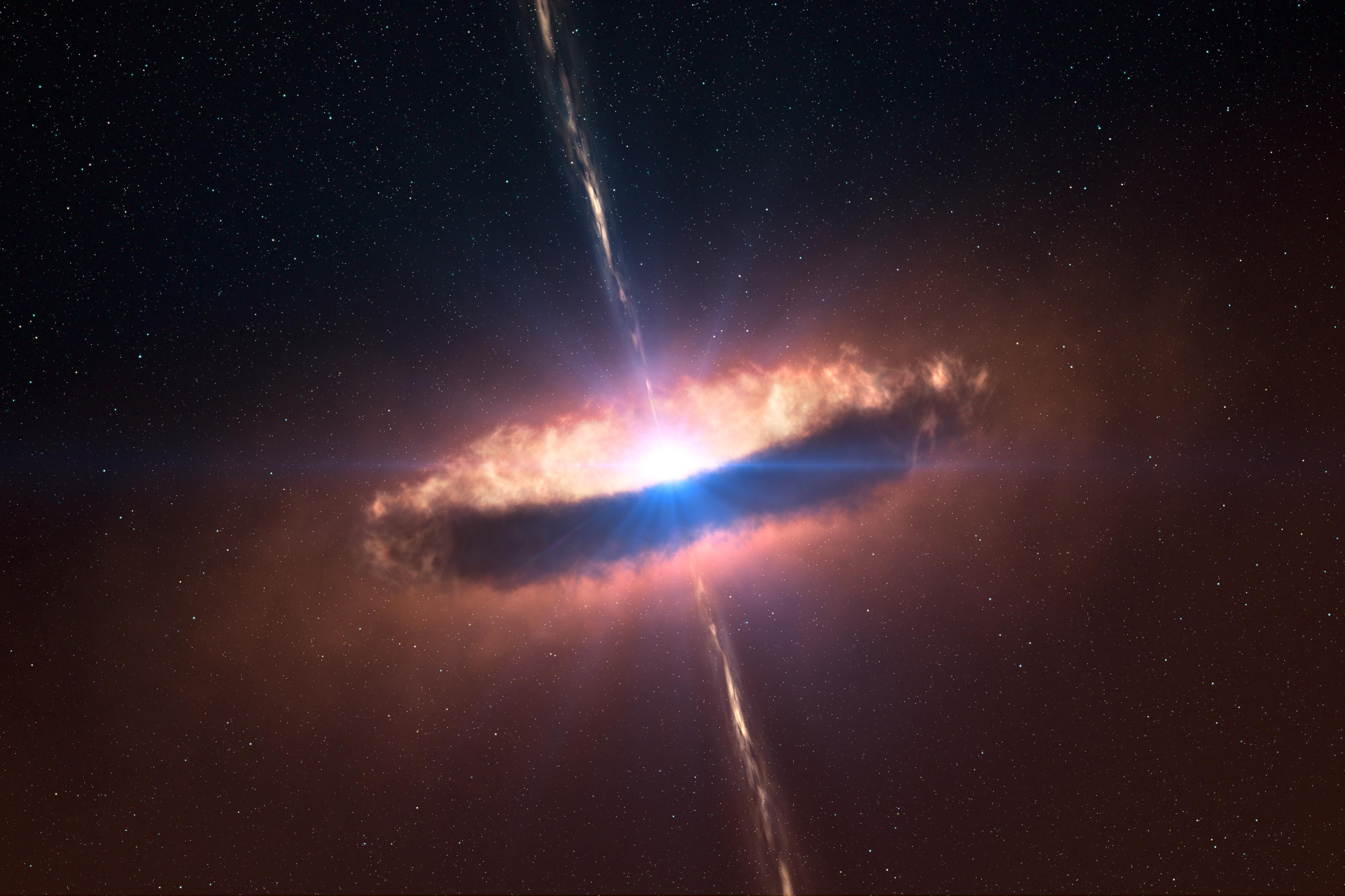
Artist's impression of disc of obscuring material around a massive star

=== Complications with distance and obscuring clouds ===
Since massive stars are rare, astronomers must look very far from Earth to find them. All the listed stars are many thousands of light years away making their light especially faint, which makes measurements difficult. In addition to being far away, many stars of such extreme mass are surrounded by clouds of outflowing gas created by extremely powerful stellar winds. This outflow obscures the stars, making it difficult to determine the physical properties of the star needed to calculate its mass: The surrounding gas interferes with the already difficult-to-obtain measurements of stellar temperatures and brightness, which greatly complicates the issue of estimating internal chemical compositions and structures. (Note: For methods that involve modelling the a star's internal dynamics, different chemical composition indicates a different estimate for stellar mass for any one measured temperature and / or brightness.)

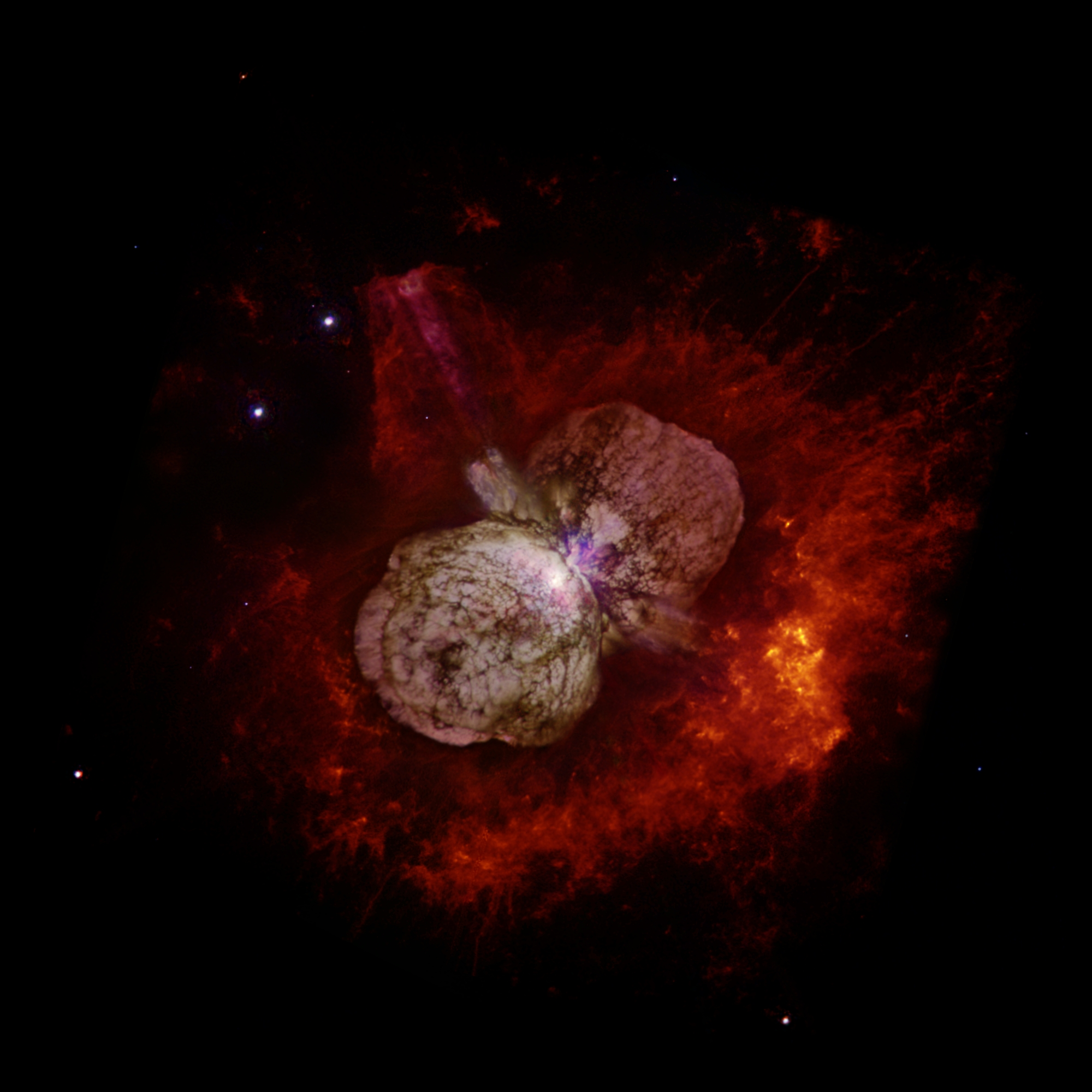
Eta Carinae is the bright spot hidden in the double-lobed dust cloud. It is the most massive star that has a Bayer designation. It was only discovered to be (at least) two stars in the past few decades.

Both the obscuring clouds and the great distances also make it difficult to judge whether the star is just a single supermassive object or, instead, a multiple star system. A number of the "stars" listed below may actually be two or more companions orbiting too closely for our telescopes to distinguish, each star possibly being massive in itself but not necessarily "supermassive" to either be on this list, or near the top of it. And certainly other combinations are possible – for example a supermassive star with one or more smaller companions or more than one giant star – but without being able to clearly see inside the surrounding cloud, it is difficult to know what kind of object is actually generating the bright point of light seen from the Earth.

More globally, statistics on stellar populations seem to indicate that the upper mass limit is in the 120-solar-mass range, so any mass estimate above this range is suspect.

=== Rare reliable estimates ===
Eclipsing binary stars are the only stars whose masses are estimated with some confidence. However, note that almost all of the masses listed in the table below were inferred by indirect methods; only a few of the masses in the table were determined using eclipsing systems.

Amongst the most reliable listed masses are those for the eclipsing binaries NGC 3603-A1, WR 21a, and WR 20a. Masses for all three were obtained from orbital measurements. (Note: For a binary star, it is possible to measure the individual masses of the two stars by studying their orbital motions, using Kepler's laws of planetary motion.) This involves measuring their radial velocities and also their light curves. The radial velocities only yield minimum values for the masses, depending on inclination, but light curves of eclipsing binaries provide the missing information: inclination of the orbit to our line of sight.

=== Relevance of stellar evolution ===
Some stars may once have been more massive than they are today. Many large stars have likely suffered significant mass loss – perhaps as much as several tens of solar masses. The lost mass is expected to have been expelled by superwinds: high velocity winds that are driven by the hot photosphere into interstellar space. The process forms an enlarged extended envelope around the star that interacts with the nearby interstellar medium and infuses the adjacent volume of space with elements heavier than hydrogen or helium. (Note: The superwinds from massive stars are similar to the superwinds generated by asymptotic giant branch (AGB) stars – red giants – that form planetary nebulae. These stars' later remnants become the (technically non-stellar) white dwarf cores of planetary nebulae.)

There are also – or rather were – stars that might have appeared on the list but no longer exist as stars, or are supernova impostors; today we see only their debris. (Note: For examples of stellar debris see hypernovae and supernova remnant.) The masses of the precursor stars that fueled these destructive events can be estimated from the type of explosion and the energy released, but those masses are not listed here.

This list only concerns "living" stars – those which are still seen by Earth-based observers existing as active stars: Still engaged in interior nuclear fusion that generates heat and light. That is, the light now arriving at the Earth as images of the stars listed still shows them to internally generate new energy as of the time (in the distant past) that light now being received was emitted. The list specifically excludes both white dwarfs – former stars that are now seen to be "dead" but radiating residual heat – and black holes – fragmentary remains of exploded stars which have gravitationally collapsed, even though accretion disks surrounding those black holes might generate heat or light exterior to the star's remains (now inside the black hole), radiated by infalling matter (see § Black holes below).

=== Mass limits ===
There are two related theoretical limits on how massive a star can possibly be: The accretion mass limit and the Eddington mass limit.

- The accretion limit is related to star formation: After about 120 M_{☉} have accreted in a protostar, the combined mass should have become hot enough for its heat to drive away any further incoming matter. In effect, the protostar reaches a temperature where it evaporates away material already collected as fast as it collects new material.
- The Eddington limit is based on light pressure from the core of an already-formed star: As mass increases past ~150 M_{☉}, the intensity of light radiated from a Population I star's core will become sufficient for the light-pressure pushing outward to exceed the gravitational force pulling inward, and the surface material of the star will be free to float away into space. Since their different compositions make them more transparent, Population II and Population III stars have higher and much higher mass limits, respectively.

==== Accretion limits ====
Astronomers have long hypothesized that as a protostar grows to a size beyond 120 M_{☉}, something drastic must happen. Although the limit can be stretched for very early Population III stars, and although the exact value is uncertain, if any stars still exist above 150~200 M_{☉} they would challenge current theories of stellar evolution.

Studying the Arches Cluster, which is currently the densest known cluster of stars in our galaxy, astronomers have confirmed that no stars in that cluster exceed about 150 M_{☉}.

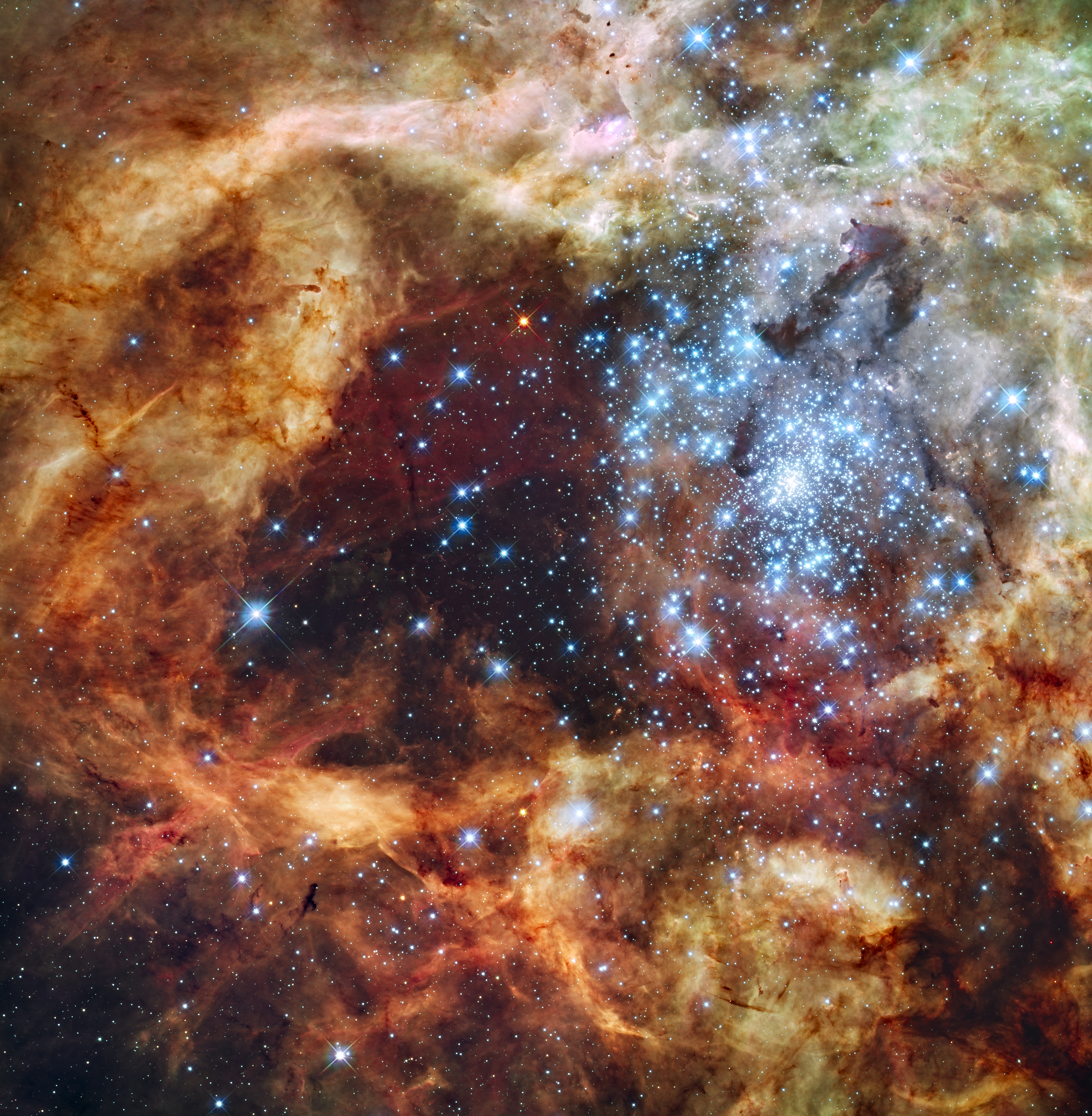
The R136 cluster is an unusually dense collection of young, hot, blue stars.

Rare ultramassive stars that exceed this limit – for example in the R136 star cluster – might be explained by an exceptional event hypothesized to have occurred: some of the pairs of massive stars in close orbit in young, unstable multiple-star systems must, on rare occasions, collide and merge when certain unusual circumstances hold that make a collision possible.

==== Eddington mass limit ====
Eddington's limit on stellar mass arises because of light-pressure: For a sufficiently massive star the outward pressure of radiant energy generated by nuclear fusion in the star's core exceeds the inward pull of its own gravity. The lowest mass for which this effect is active is the Eddington limit.

Stars of greater mass have a higher rate of core energy generation, and heavier stars' luminosities increase far out of proportion to the increase in their masses. The Eddington limit is the point beyond which a star ought to push itself apart, or at least shed enough mass to reduce its internal energy generation to a lower, sustainable rate. The actual limit-point mass depends on how opaque the gas in the star is, and metal-rich Population I stars have lower mass limits than metal-poor Population II stars. Before their demise, the hypothetical metal-free Population III stars would have had the highest allowed mass, somewhere around 300 M_{☉}.

In theory, a more massive star could not hold itself together because of the mass loss resulting from the outflow of stellar material. In practice the theoretical Eddington Limit must be modified for high luminosity stars and the empirical Humphreys–Davidson limit is used instead.

== List of the most massive known stars ==
Legend
Wolf–Rayet star
Luminous blue variable/Slash star
O-type star
B-type star
A-type star

The following two lists show a few of the known stars, including the stars in open clusters, OB associations, and H II regions. Despite their high luminosity, many of them are nevertheless too distant to be observed with the naked eye. Stars that are at least sometimes visible to the unaided eye have their apparent magnitude (6.5 or brighter) highlighted with a sky blue background.

The first list gives stars that are estimated to be 60 M_{☉} or larger; the majority of which are shown. The second list includes some notable stars which are below 60 M_{☉} for the purpose of comparison. The method used to determine each star's mass is included to give an idea of the data's uncertainty; note that the mass of binary stars can be determined far more accurately. The masses listed below are the stars' current (evolved) mass, not their initial (formation) mass.

Stars with 60 M_{☉} or greater
Name	Location	M (M_{☉})	L (L_{☉})	T_{eff} (K)	Spectral type	Dist. (ly)	m_{V}	Mass estimated by	Link	Ref.
R136a1	R136	291±46	7,244,000+699,000 −1,078,000	46,000+1,250 −2,375	WN5h	163,000	12.28±0.01	evolution	SIMBAD	
W49-2	W49 South	250±120	4,365,000+3,397,000 −1,910,000	35,500+1,700 −1,600	O2–3.5If*	36,200		evolution	SIMBAD	
BAT99-98	NGC 2070	226	5,012,000	45,000	WN6	165,000	13.5	mass-luminosity relation	SIMBAD	
R136a2	R136	195±35	5,129,000+367,000 −342,000	47,000+1,000 −625	WN5h	163,000	12.80±0.01	evolution	SIMBAD	
Melnick 42	R136	189	3,631,000	47,300	O2If*	163,000	12.86	mass-luminosity relation	SIMBAD	
R136a3	R136	184±40	5,012,000+236,000 −226,000	50,000+2,500 −8,000	WN5h	163,000	12.97±0.01	evolution	SIMBAD	
W51-57	G49.5-0.4	160	1,175,000+687,000 −544,000	42,700+2,000 −1,900	O4V	20,000		evolution		
HD 15558 A	IC 1805	≥152±51	661,000		O5.5III(f)	24,400	7.87 combined	binary	SIMBAD	
W51-3	G49.5-0.4	148+105 −82	1,349,000+626,000 −437,000–3,890,000+4,238,000 −2,028,000	39,800	O3V–O8V	20,000		evolution	SIMBAD	
Melnick 34 A	R136	147±22	2,692,000+544,000 −453,000	53,000±1,200	WN5h	163,000	13.10 combined	mass-luminosity relation	SIMBAD	
VFTS 1022	R136	142.8+25.6 −25.2	3,020,000+782,000 −621,000	42,170±1,520	O3.5If*/WN7	164,000	13.44	evolution	SIMBAD	
R136c	R136	142.0+32.7 −24.7	3,802,000+1,568,000 −1,110,000	42,170±1,890	WN5h	163,000	12.86	evolution	SIMBAD	(Note: This is a binary system but the secondary is much less massive than the primary.)
LH 10-3209 A	NGC 1763	140	2,312,000	50,900	O3III(f*)	160,000	12.73	evolution	SIMBAD	
VFTS 682	Runaway from R136	137.8+27.5 −15.9	3,236,000+838,000 −666,000	54,450±1,960	WN5h	164,000	16.08	evolution	SIMBAD	
VFTS 506	NGC 2070	136.8±24.2	2,692,000	55,000	ON2V((n))((f*))	164,000	13.31	evolution	SIMBAD	
Melnick 34 B	R136	136±20	2,344,000+474,000 −394,000	53,000±1,200	WN5h	163,000	13.10 combined	mass-luminosity relation	SIMBAD	
W51d	G49.5-0.4	135	1,288,000–2,884,000	42,700	O3V–O4V	20,000		evolution		
HD 80077	Pismis 11	133	3,388,000	17,700	B2Ia+	10,400	9.0	asteroseismology	SIMBAD	
NGC 3603-B	HD 97950	132±13	2,884,000+504,000 −429,000	42,000±2,000	WN6h	24,800	11.33	evolution	SIMBAD	
HD 269810	NGC 2029	130	2,188,000	52,500	O2III(f*)	163,000	12.22	spectroscopy	SIMBAD	
W49-1	W49 cluster 1	130±30	1,905,000+786,000 −556,000	44,700+2,100 −2,000	O2–3.5If*	36,200		evolution	SIMBAD	
R136a7	R136	127+15 −16	2,291,000+280,000 −341,000	54,000+2,000 −3,000	O3III(f*)	163,000	13.97±0.01	evolution	SIMBAD	
WR 42e	Runaway from HD 97950	123	3,200,000	43,700	O3If*/WN6	25,000	14.529	evolution	SIMBAD	
Sk -69° 249 A	NGC 2074	119	4,130,000	38,900	O7If	160,000	12.02±0.21	evolution	SIMBAD	
Sk -69° 212	NGC 2044	119	2,377,000	45,400	O5III(f)	160,000	12.416±0.0600	evolution	SIMBAD	
ST5-31	NGC 2074	119	2,168,000	50,700	O3If*	160,000	12.273±0.084	evolution	SIMBAD	
R136a5	R136	116+6 −5	2,089,000+149,000 −139,000	48,000±750	O2I(n)f*	157,000	13.71±0.01	evolution	SIMBAD	
MSP 183	Wd2	115	724,000	49,000±3,000	O3V((f))	20,000	13.878±0.017	spectroscopy	SIMBAD	
WR 24	Collinder 228	114	2,951,000	50,100	WN6ha-w	14,000	6.48	evolution	SIMBAD	
NGC 3603-C1	HD 97950	113+11 −8	2,239,000+392,000 −333,000	44,000±2,000	WN6h	24,800	11.89 combined	evolution	SIMBAD	
Arches-F9	Arches Cluster	111.3	2,239,000	36,800	WN8-9h	25,000		wind	SIMBAD	
VFTS 545	R136	110.4+18.9 −16.6	1,995,000+516,000 −410,000	47,320±1,700	O2If*/WN5	164,000	13.40	evolution	SIMBAD	
HSH95-36	R136	110±5	1,862,000+133,000 −124,000	49,500+750 −1,000	O2If*	163,000	14.41±0.01	evolution	SIMBAD	
Cygnus OB2 #12 A	Cygnus OB2	110	1,660,000	13,700	B3–4Ia+	5,200	11.702 combined	spectroscopy	SIMBAD	
Melnick 39 A	R136	109±7	1,585,000+654,000 −463,000	44,000±2,500	O3If*/WN6-A	160,000	13.0 combined	binary	SIMBAD	
R136a4	R136	108+6 −7	1,905,000+90,000 −207,000	50,000+500 −2,000	O3V((f*))(n)	157,000	13.96±0.01	evolution	SIMBAD	
VFTS 621	NGC 2070	107	1,380,000	50,100	O2V((f*))z	164,000	15.39	mass-luminosity relation	SIMBAD	
W49-3	W49 CC	105±20	1,514,000+528,000 −392,000	40,700+5,000 −4,400	O3–O7V	36,200		evolution	SIMBAD	
R99	LH 49	103	3,162,000	28,000	Ofpe/WN9	164,000	11.520±0.049	mass-luminosity relation	SIMBAD	
Arches-F6	Arches Cluster	101.0	2,089,000+255,000 −227,000	33,300±1,300	WN8-9ha	25,000		wind	SIMBAD	
Arches-F1	Arches Cluster	100.9	1,995,000	33,700	WN8-9h	25,000		wind	SIMBAD	
Peony Star	near Galactic Center	100	2,951,000+1,217,000 −862,000	25,100	WN10	26,000		evolution	SIMBAD	
HD 93129 Aa	Trumpler 14	100+25 −60	1,413,000+172,000 −154,000	52,000±3,000	O2If*	7,500	7.310±0.011 combined	spectroscopy	SIMBAD	
Mc30-1 A	Mercer 30	99	3,236,000	32,200	O6–7.5If+	40,000		evolution	SIMBAD	(Note: Mercer 30 is an open cluster in Dragonfish Nebula.)
VFTS 1028	R136	99	1,230,000	47,300	O3III(f*) or O4–5V	164,000	13.82	mass-luminosity relation	SIMBAD	
WR 25 A	Trumpler 16	98	2,399,000	50,100	WN6h-w	6,500	8.80 combined	evolution	SIMBAD	
BI 253	Runaway from R136	97.6+22.2 −23.1	1,175,000+410,000 −304,000	54,000±1,500	O2V-III(n)((f*))	164,000	13.669±0.062	evolution	SIMBAD	
R136a8	R136	96±6	1,479,000+106,000 −99,000	49,500±1,250	O2–3V	157,000	14.42±0.01	evolution	SIMBAD	
W49-15	W49 cluster 1	96±14	1,288,000+334,000 −265,000	43,700±1,000	O2–3.5If*	36,200		evolution	SIMBAD	
HM 1-6	HM 1	95	1,500,000	44,800	O5If	11,000	11.64	evolution	SIMBAD	
NGC 3603-42	HD 97950	95	946,000	46,500	O3III(f*)	25,000	12.86	evolution	SIMBAD	
ST2-22	NGC 2044	94	1,247,000	51,300	O3V((f))	160,000	14.3	evolution	SIMBAD	
VFTS 562	NGC 2070	94	1,122,000	42,200	O4V	164,000	13.66	mass-luminosity relation	SIMBAD	
NGC 3603-A1a	HD 97950	93.3±11.0	1,000,000	37,000	O3If*/WN6	24,800	11.18 combined	eclipsing binary	SIMBAD	
WR 21a A	Runaway from Wd2	93.2+2.2 −1.9	1,514,000+224,000 −195,000	42,000	O2.5If*/WN6ha	26,100	12.661±0.03 combined	eclipsing binary	SIMBAD	
HD 303308	Trumpler 16	93	1,138,000	51,300	O3V	9,200	8.17	evolution	SIMBAD	
VFTS 512	NGC 2070	93	1,096,000	47,300	O2V-III((f*))	164,000	14.28	mass-luminosity relation	SIMBAD	
R136b	R136	92±5	2,239,000+160,000 −149,000	35,500±750	O4If	163,000	13.24±0.01	evolution	SIMBAD	
VFTS 16	Runaway from R136	91.6+11.5 −10.5	1,318,000+341,000 −271,000	50,600+500 −590	O2III-If*	164,000	13.546±0.010	evolution	SIMBAD	
NGC 346-W1	NGC 346	91	1,500,000	43,400	O5.5If	200,000	12.57	evolution	SIMBAD	
NGC 3603-A3	HD 97950	91	863,000	46,400	O3III(f*)	24,800	12.95	evolution	SIMBAD	
η Carinae A	Trumpler 16	90	4,000,000	9,470 (near the top of the wind)	LBV	7,500	3.9	spectroscopy	SIMBAD	
R146	Runaway from R136	88.4+16.9 −15.8	1,950,000+505,000 −401,000	53,090±1,910	WN5ha	164,000	13.116±0.0201	evolution	SIMBAD	
WR 89	HM 1	87	2,138,000	39,800	WN8h	11,000	11.02±0.01	evolution	SIMBAD	
Arches-F7	Arches Cluster	86.3	1,862,000+227,000 −203,000	33,900±1,300	WN8-9ha	25,000		wind	SIMBAD	
R147	Runaway from R136	85.6+15.2 −16.6	2,291,000+593,000 −471,000	47,320±1,700	WN5h	164,000	12.993±0.042	evolution	SIMBAD	
Sk 80	NGC 346	85	1,500,000	38,900	O7If	200,000	12.31	evolution	SIMBAD	
BAT99-92 B	Tarantula Nebula	85	1,175,000	23,000	B1Ia	165,000	11.39±0.02 combined	spectroscopy	SIMBAD	
Sk -70° 91	BSDL 1830	84.09	851,000	48,849	ON2III	165,000	12.78	evolution	SIMBAD	(Note: BSDL 1830 is a star cluster in Large Magellanic Cloud.)
Sk -66° 172	LH 95	84.09	851,000	48,849	O2III(f*)	160,000	13.1	evolution	SIMBAD	
Sk -68° 137	Runaway from R136	84.09	851,000	48,849	O2III(f*)	160,000	13.346±0.0101	evolution	SIMBAD	
LH 64-16	NGC 2001	84.09	851,000	48849	ON2III(f*)	160,000	13.666±0.010	evolution	SIMBAD	
Melnick 33Na A	R136	83±19	1,413,000+725,000 −479,000	50,000±2,500	OC2.5If*	163,000	13.79 combined	evolution	SIMBAD	
Melnick 39 B	R136	83±5	1,000,000+413,000 −292,000	48,000±2,500	O3If*/WN6-A	160,000	13.0 combined	binary	SIMBAD	
WR 20a A	Wd2	82.2±4.7	603,000+139,000 −113,000	43,000	WN6ha	20,000	13.5 combined	eclipsing binary	SIMBAD	
Arches-F2 A	Arches Cluster	82±12	1,862,000+227,000 −203,000	34,100+2,000 −1,000	WN8–9h	25,000		eclipsing binary	SIMBAD	
R139 A	NGC 2070	81.6+7.5 −7.2	1,585,000+235,000 −205,000	34,000±1,100	O6.5I	163,000	11.94 combined	evolution	SIMBAD	
WR 20a B	Wd2	81.4±4.7	537,000+124,000 −101,000	41,840±250	WN6ha	20,000	13.5 combined	eclipsing binary	SIMBAD	
Tr27-27	Trumpler 27	81	1,247,000	37,200	O8III((f))	3,900	13.31	evolution	SIMBAD	
HSH95-46	R136	80+5 −6	1,259,000+59,000 −162,000	47,500+500 −2,500	O2-3III(f*)	163,000	14.56±0.01	evolution	SIMBAD	
Arches-F15	Arches Cluster	79.7	794,000+118,000 −102,000	32,000±1,500	O6–7Ia+	25,000		wind	SIMBAD	
BI 237	BSDL 2527	79.66	661,000	51,269	O2V((f*))	165,000	13.830±0.0431	spectroscopy	SIMBAD	(Note: BSDL 2527 is a star cluster in Large Magellanic Cloud.)
VFTS 1017	R136	79.0+17.8 −15.9	1,622,000+420,000 −334,000	50,120±1,800	O2If*/WN5	164,000	14.50	evolution	SIMBAD	
VFTS 151	TLD1	79	1,072,000	42,200	O6.5II(f)p	164,000		mass-luminosity relation	SIMBAD	
VFTS 94	NGC 2060	79	955,000	42,200	O3.5Inf*p	164,000	14.161±0.0271	mass-luminosity relation	SIMBAD	
VFTS 1018	R136	79	832,000	42,200	O3III(f*)	163,000	14.34	mass-luminosity relation	SIMBAD	
LH 41-32	NGC 1910	78	946,000	48,200	O4III	160,000	13.086±0.0101	evolution	SIMBAD	
Pismis 24-17	Pismis 24	78	851,000		O3.5III	5,900	11.84	spectroscopy	SIMBAD	
LSS 4067	HM 1	77	794,000+118,000 −102,000	40,000±2,000	O4If	11,000	11.26±0.07	evolution	SIMBAD	
W51-2	G49.2-0.3	77+26 −22	724000+167000 −136000–1288000+617000 −417000	42,700+2,000 −1,900	O3V–O5V	20,000		evolution	SIMBAD	
R139 B	NGC 2070	76.4+7.1 −6.7	1,445,000+214,000 −187,000	34,700±1,100	O7I	163,000	11.94 combined	evolution	SIMBAD	
NGC 346-W3	NGC 346	76	813,000+99,000 −88,000	51,300	O2III(f*)	200,000	12.80±0.04	evolution	SIMBAD	
BAT99-68	NGC 2044	76	1,000,000	45,000	O3If*/WN7	165,000	14.13	mass-luminosity relation	SIMBAD	
HD 93632	Collinder 228	76	946,000	45,400	O5III(f)	10,000	9.10	evolution	SIMBAD	
AB1	DEM S10	75	1,175,000	79,000	WN3ha	197,000	15.24±0.02	spectroscopy	SIMBAD	(Note: DEM S10 is a H II region in Small Magellanic Cloud.)
VFTS 457	NGC 2070	74.6+20.1 −9.2	1,585,000+410,000 −326,000	39,810±1,430	O3.5If*/WN7	164,000	13.74	evolution	SIMBAD	
HD 38282 A	Runaway from R136	74±4	2,754,000+336,000 −300,000	50,000±2,000	WN5/6h	163,000	11.11±0.03 combined	binary	SIMBAD	
BAT99-6 A	NGC 1747	74	794,000	45,000	O3If*/WN7	165,000	11.95 combined	spectroscopy	SIMBAD	
VFTS 608	NGC 2070	74	724,000	42,200	O4III(f)	164,000	14.22	mass-luminosity relation	SIMBAD	
HSH95-31	R136	73±3	955,000+68,000 −64,000	47,500+1,000 −750	O2V((f*))	163,000	14.35	evolution	SIMBAD	
Mc30-11	Mercer 30	73	741,000	36,800	O5.5-6I-II	40,000		spectroscopy	SIMBAD	
Mc30-3	Mercer 30	73	676,000	39,300	O6If	40,000		spectroscopy	SIMBAD	
VFTS 599	NGC 2070	72.0+9.2 −7.4	1,023,000+265,000 −210,000	47,300+820 −500	O3III(f*)	164,000	13.80	evolution	SIMBAD	
NGC 2044-W35	NGC 2044	72	863,000	48,200	O4III	160,000	14.10	evolution	SIMBAD	
VFTS 542	R136	71.4+16.3 −11.3	1,445,000+374,000 −297,000	44,670±2,010	O2If*/WN5	164,000	13.47	evolution	SIMBAD	
VFTS 1021	R136	71.4+12.7 −9.2	1,259,000+326,000 −259,000	35,500±1,500	O4If+	164,000	13.31	evolution	SIMBAD	
ST2-1	NGC 2044	71	946,000	44,100	O5.5III	160,000	14.3	evolution	SIMBAD	
NGC 3603-A1b	HD 97950	70.4±9.3	1,000,000	42,000	O3If*/WN5	24,800	11.18 combined	eclipsing binary	SIMBAD	
Arches-F12	Arches Cluster	70.0	1,585,000	37,300	WN7–8h	25,000		wind	SIMBAD	
HD 37974	NGC 2050	70	1,400,000	22,500	B0.5Ia+	163,000	10.99±0.03	spectroscopy	SIMBAD	
M33 X-7 B	Triangulum Galaxy	70.0±6.9	525,000+92,000 −78,000	34,000–36,000	O7III–O8III	2,700,000	18.70	binary	SIMBAD	
QZ Carinae Aa1	Collinder 228	69.8±5	398,000	29,564±1,000	O9.7I	9,200	6.24 combined	quaternary	SIMBAD	
VFTS 125	NGC 2060	69.6+22.3 −17.2	794,000+496,000 −281,000	55,150±5,520	Ope	164,000	16.6	evolution	SIMBAD	
HD 38282 B	Runaway from R136	69±4	2,455,000+300,000 −267,000	45,000±2,000	WN6/7h	163,000	11.11±0.03 combined	binary	SIMBAD	
HD 229059	Berkeley 87	69	1,038,000	26,300	B1Ia	3,000	8.70	evolution	SIMBAD	
ST2-32	NGC 2044	69	863,000	45,400	O5III	160,000	13.903±0.0921	evolution	SIMBAD	
ST2-3	NGC 2044	69	863,000	44,100	O5.5V	160,000	14.264±0.1241	evolution	SIMBAD	
W28-23	NGC 2033	69	655,000	51,300	O3V	160,000	13.702±0.050	evolution	SIMBAD	
HD 46150	NGC 2244	69	447,000+129,000 −100,000	42,500+2,100 −2,000	O5V((f))z	5,200	6.73	evolution	SIMBAD	
HD 93403 A	Carina OB1	68.5+12.3 −14.6	1,047,000+49,000 −47,000	39,300±1,100	O5.5I	10,400	8.27±0.74 combined	evolution	SIMBAD	
HSH95-47	R136	68±4	955,000+117,000 −64,000	43,500+1,750 −1,000	O2V((f*))	163,000	14.72±0.01	evolution	SIMBAD	
HSH95-48	R136	68±4	912,000+65,000 −80,000	46,500+1,000 −1,500	O2–3III(f*)	163,000	14.75±0.01	evolution	SIMBAD	
HD 93130	Collinder 228	68	863,000	39,900	O7II(f)	10,000	8.04	evolution	SIMBAD	
W51-61	G49.5-0.4	68	309,000+159,000 −135,000	38,500±800	O7.5V	20,000		evolution	SIMBAD	
Sk -69° 200	NGC 2033	67	1,038,000	26,300	B1I	160,000	11.18	evolution	SIMBAD	
Arches-F18	Arches Cluster	66.9	1,122,000	37,300	O4–5Ia+	25,000		wind	SIMBAD	
Arches-F4	Arches Cluster	66.4	1,995,000	37,300	WN7–8h	25,000		wind	SIMBAD	
Z15	Messier 81	66.1	1,445,000+139,000 −127,000	25,000±1,000	B0.5	11,986,000	20.495	spectroscopy	SIMBAD	
HD 5980 B	NGC 346	66±10	1,778,000+734,000 −519,000	45,000+10,000 −7,000	WN6−7	200,000	11.31±0.08 combined	binary	SIMBAD	
Sk -67° 108	LMC	66±2	933,000+67,000 −82,000	43,500+750 −1,000	O5III(f)	164,000	12.525	evolution	SIMBAD	
HD 190429 A	near Barnard 146	66.0+17.4 −13.4	912,000	39,000	O4If	7,800	7.09±0.01	spectroscopy	SIMBAD	
LH 31-1003	NGC 1858	66	863,000	41,900	O6Ib(f)	160,000	13.186±0.0101	evolution	SIMBAD	
VFTS 169	NGC 2060	66.0±9.8	813,000+284,000 −210,000	47,000±1,500	O2.5V(n)((f*))	164,000	14.437±0.0251	evolution	SIMBAD	
Pismis 24-1SW	Pismis 24	66	646,000		O4III	6,500		evolution	SIMBAD	
HSH95-89	R136	65+10 −9	977,000+198,000 −145,000	44,000±2,500	O4V	163,000	14.76±0.01	spectroscopy	SIMBAD	
HSH95-40	R136	65+6 −7	851,000+104,000 −159,000	47,500+2,000 −3,250	O3V	163,000	14.49	evolution	SIMBAD	
HSH95-58	R136	65+6 −7	741,000+150,000 −96,000	47,500+3,000 −2,250	O2–3V	163,000	14.80±0.01	evolution	SIMBAD	
VFTS 145	TLD1	65	741,000	39,800	O8fp	164,000	14.30	mass-luminosity relation	SIMBAD	
VFTS 518	NGC 2070	65	562,000	44,700	O3.5III(f*)	164,000	15.11	mass-luminosity relation	SIMBAD	
W49-8	W49 CC	65±13	676,000+279,000 −197,000	40,700+5,000 −4,400	O3–O7V	36,200		evolution	SIMBAD	
BD+43° 3654	Runaway from Cygnus OB2	64.6	2,030,000±210,000	46,800±900	O6If+	5,400	10.06±0.04	evolution	SIMBAD	
Sk -70° 115	NGC 2122	64+3 −2	1,047,000+101,000 −92,000	34,750±1,000	O6.5Ifc	164,000	12.166±0.0900	evolution	SIMBAD	
Sk -69° 25	NGC 1748	64	787,000	43,600	O6V((f))	160,000	11.886±0.0101	evolution	SIMBAD	
HSH95-50	R136	64+5 −4	708,000+86,000 −62,000	47,000+2,000 −1,250	O3–4V((f*))	163,000	14.65±0.01	evolution	SIMBAD	
W49-5	W49 cluster 1	64±8	661,000+171,000 −136,000	42,700+2,000 −1,900	O3–O5V	36,200		evolution	SIMBAD	
ST5-71	NGC 2074	63	718,000	45,400	O5III	160,000	13.266±0.0201	evolution	SIMBAD	
VFTS 259	Tarantula Nebula	62.6+7.8 −8.6	1,000,000+259,000 −206,000	36,800+500 −520	O6Iaf	164,000	13.65	evolution	SIMBAD	
Mc30-6a A	Mercer 30	62	1,349,000	29,900	Ofpe/WN9	40,000		evolution	SIMBAD	
AB9	DEM S80	62	1,122,000	100,000	WN3ha	197,000	15.26±0.13	spectroscopy	SIMBAD	(Note: DEM S80 is a H II region in Small Magellanic Cloud.)
LH 41-1017	NGC 1910	62	787,000	42,700	B1	160,000	12.266±0.0101	evolution	SIMBAD	
Brey 32 B	NGC 1966	62	718,000	43,600	O6.5V	165,000	12.317±0.02 combined	evolution	SIMBAD	
HD 93160	Trumpler 14	62	718,000	42,700	O6III	8,000	7.60	evolution	SIMBAD	
HSH95-35	R136	62+4 −3	661,000+64,000 −44,000	47,500+1,500 −1,000	O3V	163,000	14.32±0.01	evolution	SIMBAD	
HD 229196	Cygnus OB9	61.6		40,862	O5	5,000	8.59	evolution	SIMBAD	
HD 5980 A	NGC 346	61±10	2,239,000+580,000 −460,000	45,000±5,000	WN6h	200,000	11.31±0.08 combined	binary	SIMBAD	
WR 102hb	Quintuplet cluster	61	2,630,000	25,100	WN9h	26,000		evolution	SIMBAD	
VFTS 267	Tarantula Nebula	61+3 −2	813,000+78,000 −72,000	42,500±1,250	O3.5III(f*)	164,000	13.49	evolution	SIMBAD	
LH 41-18	NGC 1910	61	787,000	38,500	O8.5V((f))	160,000	12.586±0.0101	evolution	SIMBAD	
AB8 B	NGC 602c	61+14 −25	708,000+183,000 −146,000	45,000±5,000	O4V	197,000	12.90 combined	binary	SIMBAD	
Mc30-9 A	Mercer 30	61	676,000	34,500	O6-7I-III	40,000		evolution	SIMBAD	
ST5-25	NGC 2074	61	545,000	48,600	O4V	160,000	13.551±0.109	spectroscopy	SIMBAD	
VFTS 422	NGC 2070	61	501,000	39,800	O4III(f)	164,000	15.14	mass-luminosity relation	SIMBAD	
Sk -67° 166	NGC 2014	60.68	832,000	41,809	O4If+	160,000	12.22±0.03	spectroscopy	SIMBAD	
Sk -65° 47	NGC 1923	60.68	832,000	41,809	O4If	160,000	12.466±0.1521	spectroscopy	SIMBAD	
Mc30-7 A	Mercer 30	60	1,738,000	41,400	WN6	40,000		evolution	SIMBAD	
BAT99-96	NGC 2070	60.0+9.2 −7.7	1,349,000+349,000 −277,000	41,690±1,500	WN8(h)	164,000	13.76	evolution	SIMBAD	
Arches-F2 B	Arches Cluster	60±8	1,349,000+165,000 −147,000	33,800+2,000 −1,000	O5–6Ia+	25,000		eclipsing binary	SIMBAD	
HSH95-55	R136	60+6 −5	589,000+119,000 −52,000	47,500+3,000 −1,500	O2V((f*))z	163,000	14.74±0.01	evolution	SIMBAD	

A few notable large stars with masses less than 60 M_{☉} are shown in the table below for the purpose of comparison, ending with the Sun, which is very close, but would otherwise be too small to be included in the list. At present, all the listed stars are naked-eye visible and relatively nearby.

Star name	Location	Mass (M_{☉}, Sun = 1)	Eff. temp. (K)	Approx. dist. (ly)	Appt. vis. mag.	Mass est. method	Link	Ref.
λ Cephei	Runaway star from Cepheus OB3	51.4	36,000	3,100	5.05	spectroscopy	SIMBAD	
τ Canis Majoris Aa	NGC 2362	50	32,000	5,120	4.89	evolution	SIMBAD	
θ Muscae Ab	Centaurus OB1	44	33,000	7,400	5.53 combined	evolution	SIMBAD	
θ^{2} Orionis A	Orion OB1 of Orion complex	39	34,900	1,500	5.02	evolution	SIMBAD	
α Camelopardalis	Runaway star from NGC 1502	37.6	29,000	6,000	4.29	evolution	SIMBAD	
P Cygni	IC 4996 of Cygnus OB1	37	18,700	5,100	4.82	spectroscopy	SIMBAD	(Note: IC 4996 is an open cluster in Cygnus OB1.)
ζ^{1} Scorpii	NGC 6231 of Scorpius OB1	36 - 53	17,200	8,210	4.705	spectroscopy	SIMBAD	
ζ Orionis Aa	Alnitak in Orion OB1 of Orion complex	33	29,500	1,260	2.08	evolution	SIMBAD	
θ^{1} Orionis C1	Trapezium Cluster of Orion complex	33	39,000	1,340	5.13 combined	evolution	SIMBAD	
κ Cassiopeiae	Cassiopeia OB14	33	23,500	4,000	4.16	evolution	SIMBAD	
μ Normae	NGC 6169	33	28,000	3,260	4.91	spectroscopy	SIMBAD	
η Carinae B	Trumpler 16 of Carina Nebula	30	37,200	7,500	4.3 combined	binary	SIMBAD	
γ^{2} Velorum B	Vela OB2	28.5	35,000	1,230	1.83 combined	evolution	SIMBAD	
Alnilam	ε Orionis in Orion OB1 of Orion complex	28.4±2.0	25,000	1,250	1.69	spectroscopy + interferometry	SIMBAD	
Meissa A	In Collinder 69 of Orion complex	27.9	37,700	1,300	3.54	spectroscopy	SIMBAD	
ξ Persei	Menkib in California Nebula of Perseus OB2	26.1	35,000	1,200	4.04	evolution	SIMBAD	
ζ Puppis	Naos in Vela R2 of Vela Molecular Ridge	25.3±5.3	40,000	1,080	2.25	empirical	SIMBAD	(Note: Vela R2 is a OB association in Vela Molecular Ridge.)
WR 79a	NGC 6231 of Scorpius OB1	24.4	35,000	5,600	5.77	spectroscopy	SIMBAD	
Mintaka Aa1	In Orion OB1 of Orion complex	24	29,500	1,200	2.5 combined	evolution	SIMBAD	
ι Orionis Aa1	Hatysa in NGC 1980 of Orion complex	23.1	32,500	1,340	2.77 combined	evolution	SIMBAD	
κ Crucis	Jewel Box Cluster of Centaurus OB1	23	16,300	7,500	5.98	evolution	SIMBAD	
WR 78	NGC 6231 of Scorpius OB1	22	50,100	4,100	6.48	spectroscopy	SIMBAD	
ο^{2} Canis Majoris	Field star	21.4	15,500	2,800	3.043	evolution	SIMBAD	
Rigel A	In Orion OB1 of Orion complex	21	12,100	860	0.13	evolution	SIMBAD	
ζ Ophiuchi	Upper Scorpius subgroup of Scorpius OB2	20.2	34,000	370	2.569	evolution	SIMBAD	
υ Orionis	Orion OB1 of Orion complex	20	33,400	2,900	4.618	evolution	SIMBAD	
σ Orionis Aa	Orion OB1 of Orion complex	18	35,000	1,260	4.07 combined	spectroscopy	SIMBAD	
μ Columbae	Runaway star from Trapezium Cluster	16	33,000	1,300	5.18	spectroscopy	SIMBAD	
Saiph	In Orion OB1 of Orion complex	15.5	26,500	650	2.09	evolution	SIMBAD	
σ Cygni	Cygnus OB4	15	10,800	3,260	4.233	evolution	SIMBAD	
θ Carinae A	IC 2602 of Scorpius OB2	14.9	31,000	460	2.76 combined	evolution	SIMBAD	
θ^{2} Orionis B	Orion OB1 of Orion complex	14.8	29,300	1,500	6.38	spectroscopy	SIMBAD	
ζ Persei	Perseus OB2	14.5	20,800	750	2.86	evolution	SIMBAD	
σ Orionis B	Orion OB1 of Orion complex	14	31,000	1,260	4.07 combined	spectroscopy	SIMBAD	
β Canis Majoris	Mirzam in Local Bubble of Scorpius OB2	13.5	23,200	490	1.985	evolution	SIMBAD	
ε Persei A	α Persei Cluster	13.5	26,500	640	2.88 combined	evolution	SIMBAD	
ι Orionis Aa2	NGC 1980 of Orion complex	13.1	27,000	1,340	2.77 combined	evolution	SIMBAD	
δ Scorpii A	Dschubba in Upper Scorpius subgroup of Scorpius OB2	13	27,400	440	2.307 combined	evolution	SIMBAD	
σ Orionis Ab	Orion OB1 of Orion complex	13	29,000	1,260	4.07 combined	spectroscopy	SIMBAD	
θ Muscae Aa	WR 48 in Centaurus OB1	11.5	83,000	7,400	5.53 combined	spectroscopy	SIMBAD	
γ^{2} Velorum A	WR 11 in Vela OB2	9	57,000	1,230	1.83 combined	spectroscopy	SIMBAD	
ρ Ophiuchi A	ρ Ophiuchi cloud complex of Scorpius OB2	8.7	22,000	360	4.63 combined	evolution	SIMBAD	
Bellatrix	In Bellatrix Cluster of Orion complex	7.7	21,800	250	1.64	evolution	SIMBAD	
Antares B	Loop I Bubble of Scorpius OB2	7.2	18,500	550	5.5	evolution	SIMBAD	
λ Tauri A	Pisces-Eridanus stellar stream	7.18	18,700	480	3.47 combined	evolution	SIMBAD	
δ Persei	α Persei Cluster	7	14,900	520	3.01	evolution	SIMBAD	
ψ Persei	α Persei Cluster	6.2	16,000	580	4.31	evolution	SIMBAD	
α Pavonis Aa	Peacock in Tucana-Horologium association	5.91	17,700	180	1.94	evolution	SIMBAD	
Alcyone	In Pleiades	5.9	12,300	440	2.87 combined	evolution	SIMBAD	
γ Canis Majoris	Muliphein in Collinder 121	5.6	13,600	440	4.1	evolution	SIMBAD	
η Canis Majoris	Aludra in Collinder 121	5.5 or 9.5	15,000	2,000	2.45	SED modelling / spectroscopy	SIMBAD	
ο Velorum	IC 2391 of Scorpius OB2	5.5	16,200	490	3.6	evolution	SIMBAD	
ο Aquarii	Pisces-Eridanus stellar stream	4.2	13,500	440	4.71	evolution	SIMBAD	
ν Fornacis	Pisces-Eridanus stellar stream	3.65	13,400	370	4.69	evolution	SIMBAD	
φ Eridani	Tucana-Horologium association	3.55	13,700	150	3.55	evolution	SIMBAD	
η Chamaeleontis	η Chamaeleontis moving group of Scorpius OB2	3.2	12,500	310	5.453	evolution	SIMBAD	
ε Chamaeleontis	ε Chamaeleontis moving group of Scorpius OB2	2.87	10,900	360	4.91	evolution	SIMBAD	
τ^{1} Aquarii	Pisces-Eridanus stellar stream	2.68	10,600	320	5.66	evolution	SIMBAD	
ε Hydri	Tucana-Horologium association	2.64	11,000	150	4.12	evolution	SIMBAD	
β^{1} Tucanae	Tucana-Horologium association	2.5	10,600	140	4.37	evolution	SIMBAD	
Sirius A	~11 th nearest star	2.06	9,850	8.6	−1.46	evolution	SIMBAD	
Sun	Solar System	1	5,772	0.0000158	−26.744	standard	IAU	

== Black holes ==
Black holes are the end point of the evolution of massive stars. (Note: A very few low / no metallicity stars (populations II and III) between 140–250 M_{☉} end their lives by a type II-P supernova explosion, which is powerful enough to blow (almost) all matter away from the vicinity of the star, so that not enough material remains to create either a black hole, or a neutron star, or a white dwarf: There is no central remnant; all that remains is an expanding shell of shocked gas from the SN explosion colliding with previously quiescent material ejected before the core collapse explosion.) Technically they are not stars, as they no longer generate heat and light via nuclear fusion in their cores. Some black holes may have cosmological origins, and would then never have been stars. This is thought to be especially likely in the cases of the most massive black holes.

- Stellar black holes are objects with approximately 4–15 M_{☉}.
- Intermediate-mass black holes range from 100 to 10000 M_{☉}.
- Supermassive black holes are in the range of millions or billions M_{☉}.

== See also ==
- Hypergiant
- List of brightest stars
- List of brown dwarfs
- List of galaxies
- List of hottest stars
- List of largest cosmic structures
- List of largest nebulae
- List of largest stars
- List of most luminous stars
- List of most massive black holes
- List of most massive neutron stars
- List of most massive star clusters
- Lists of stars
- Luminous blue variable
- Supergiant
- Supernova impostor
- Wolf–Rayet star
