= BAT99-98 =

Star in the constellation Dorado

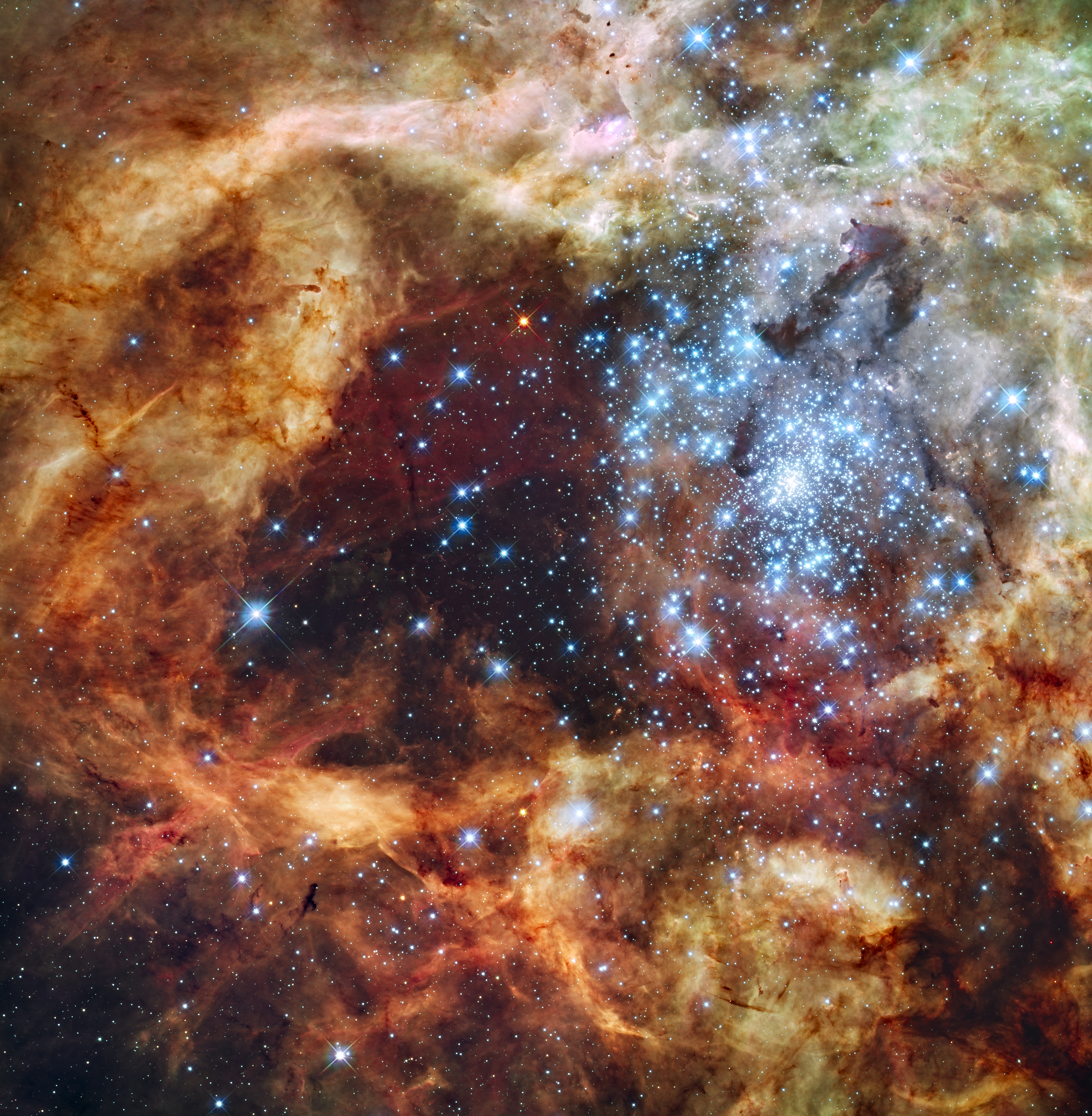
- NGC 2070; full-size image is annotated

Observation data Epoch J2000 Equinox J2000
- Constellation: Dorado
- Right ascension: 05^{h} 38^{m} 39.144^{s}
- Declination: −69° 06′ 21.30″
- Apparent magnitude (V): 13.38

Characteristics
- Evolutionary stage: Wolf–Rayet
- Spectral type: WN6
- B−V color index: −0.10

Astrometry
Proper motion (μ)	RA: 1.680 mas/yr Dec.: 0.512 mas/yr
Parallax (π)	0.0288±0.0159 mas
Distance	165,000 ly (50,600 pc)
Absolute magnitude (M_{V})	−8.11
Absolute bolometric magnitude (M_{bol})	−12.0

Details
Mass	226 (highly uncertain) M_{☉}
Radius	37.5 R_{☉}
Luminosity	5,012,000 L_{☉}
Luminosity (visual, L_{V})	141,000 L_{☉}
Temperature	45,000 K

Other designations
- Brey 79, NGC 2070 MEL J, SSTISAGEMC J053839.14−690621.2, BAT99 98, LMC AB12, Melnick 49, 2MASS J05383914−6906211, UCAC4 105‑014273

Database references
SIMBAD	data

BAT99-98 is a Wolf–Rayet star located in the Large Magellanic Cloud, in NGC 2070 near the R136 cluster in the Tarantula Nebula (30 Doradus). At estimates of 226 M_{☉} and 5,012,000 L_{☉}, it is one of the most massive known stars, and close to one of the most luminous stars currently known.

== Observations ==
A 1978 survey carried out by Jorge Melnick covered the 30 Doradus region and found six new Wolf–Rayet (WR) stars, all belonging to the WN sequence. The survey observed stars that were above apparent magnitude 14 and within 2 arcminutes of the centre of the 30 Doradus nebula, and the star now known as BAT99‑98 was labelled as star J. It was found to have a magnitude of 13.5 and a spectral type of WN5.

The following year, thirteen new WR stars in the Large Magellanic Cloud were reported, one of which was Mel J. It was numbered 12, and referred to as AB12, or LMC AB12 to distinguish it from the better-known AB stars in the Small Magellanic Cloud.

Melnick conducted another study of stars in NGC 2070 and gave BAT99-98 the number 49, reclassifying its spectral type as WN7.

Neither the AB12 nor the Mel J designation is in common use, although "Melnick 49" is sometimes seen. More commonly, LMC Wolf–Rayet stars are referred to by R (Radcliffe Observatory) numbers, Brey (Breysacher catalogue numbers), or BAT99 numbers.

== Characteristics ==
BAT99‑98 is located near the R136 cluster and has similar mass–luminosity properties to the massive stars in the cluster itself. It is estimated that the star held 250 M_{☉} at its birth and has since lost 20 M_{☉}. It sheds a large amount of mass through a stellar wind that moves at 1,600 km/s. The star has a surface temperature of 45,000 K and a luminosity of 5,012,000 L_{☉}. Although the star is very luminous due to its high temperature, much of that light is ultraviolet and invisible to humans – making it 141,000 times brighter than the Sun visually. It is now classified as a WN6 star, and models suggest that it is 7.5 million years old.

== Fate ==
The future of BAT99-98 depends on its mass loss. It is thought that stars this massive can never lose enough mass to avoid a catastrophic end. The result is likely to be a supernova, hypernova, gamma-ray burst, or perhaps almost no visible explosion, leaving behind a black hole or neutron star. The exact details depend heavily on the timing and amount of the mass loss, with current models not fully reproducing observed stars, but the majority of massive stars in the Local Group are expected to produce Type Ib or Ic supernovae, sometimes with a gamma-ray burst, and leave behind a black hole. However, for some stars of exceptionally high mass, the supernova event is triggered by pair instability and leaves behind no remnant at all.

== See also ==
- Lynx Arc
