= Melnick 34 =

Binary star in the Large Magellanic cloud

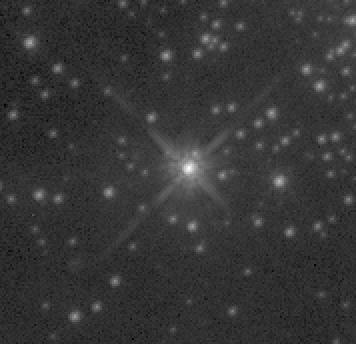
- Melnick 34; Credit: Wide Field and Planetary Camera of the Hubble Space Telescope

Observation data Epoch J2000.0 Equinox J2000.0
- Constellation: Dorado
- Right ascension: -5^{h} 38^{m} 44.26^{s}
- Declination: −69° 06′ 05.9″
- Apparent magnitude (V): 13.09

Characteristics
- Evolutionary stage: main sequence
- Spectral type: WN5h + WN5h
- B−V color index: +0.25

Astrometry
Radial velocity (R_{v})	287±5 km/s
Proper motion (μ)	RA: 1.848 mas/yr Dec.: 0.490 mas/yr
Distance	163,000 ly (49,970 pc)
Absolute magnitude (M_{V})	−7.42

Orbit
Period (P)	154.55±0.05 d
Eccentricity (e)	0.68±0.02
Inclination (i)	~50°
Periastron epoch (T)	57671.2±0.9 JD
Argument of periastron (ω) (secondary)	20.9±3.8°
Semi-amplitude (K_{1}) (primary)	130±7 km/s
Semi-amplitude (K_{2}) (secondary)	141±6 km/s

Details

A
Mass	148 M_{☉}
Radius	19.3±2.8 R_{☉}
Luminosity	2,042,000 L_{☉}
Temperature	53,000±1,200 K
Age	0.5±0.3 Myr

B
Mass	135 M_{☉}
Radius	18.2±2.7 R_{☉}
Luminosity	1,585,000 L_{☉}
Temperature	53,000±1,200 K
Age	0.6±0.3 Myr

Other designations
- BAT99-116, Melnick 34, 2MASS J05384424-6906058, Brey 84

Database references
SIMBAD	data

Melnick 34 (abbreviated to Mk34), also called BAT99-116, is a binary Wolf–Rayet star near R136 in the 30 Doradus complex (also known as the Tarantula Nebula) in the Large Magellanic Cloud. Both components are amongst the most massive and most luminous stars known, and the system is the most massive known binary system.

== Binary ==
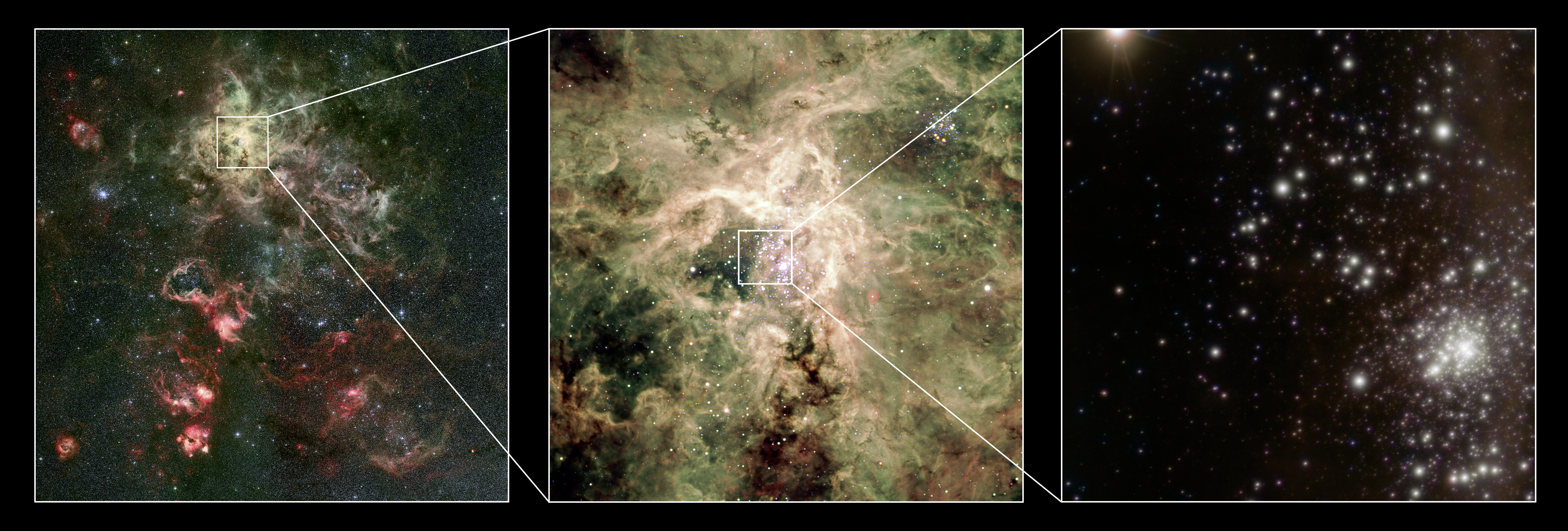
NGC 2070 region. MK 34 is the bright isolated star to the left of the R136 cluster in the righthand panel.

Melnick 34 is a binary star with an orbital period of 155 days. It shows high x-ray luminosity characteristic of colliding-wind binaries, and periodic variations in luminosity, spectral absorption, and the x-ray brightness.

The orbit has been calculated based on spectroscopic observations with the Very Large Telescope. The two components have identical spectral types of WN5h and the spectral lines of each vary every 155 days, indicating projected orbital motions with speeds of 130 km/s and 141 km/s respectively. The similar orbital speeds show that the two components have similar masses; the secondary has a mass 92% of the primary, assuming an inclination near 50°. The inclination of 50° best matches the orbital properties of the two stars to their observed properties. The primary is designated A and the secondary B. The orbit is moderately eccentric, with a periastron separation of about 0.9 AU.

== Physical characteristics ==
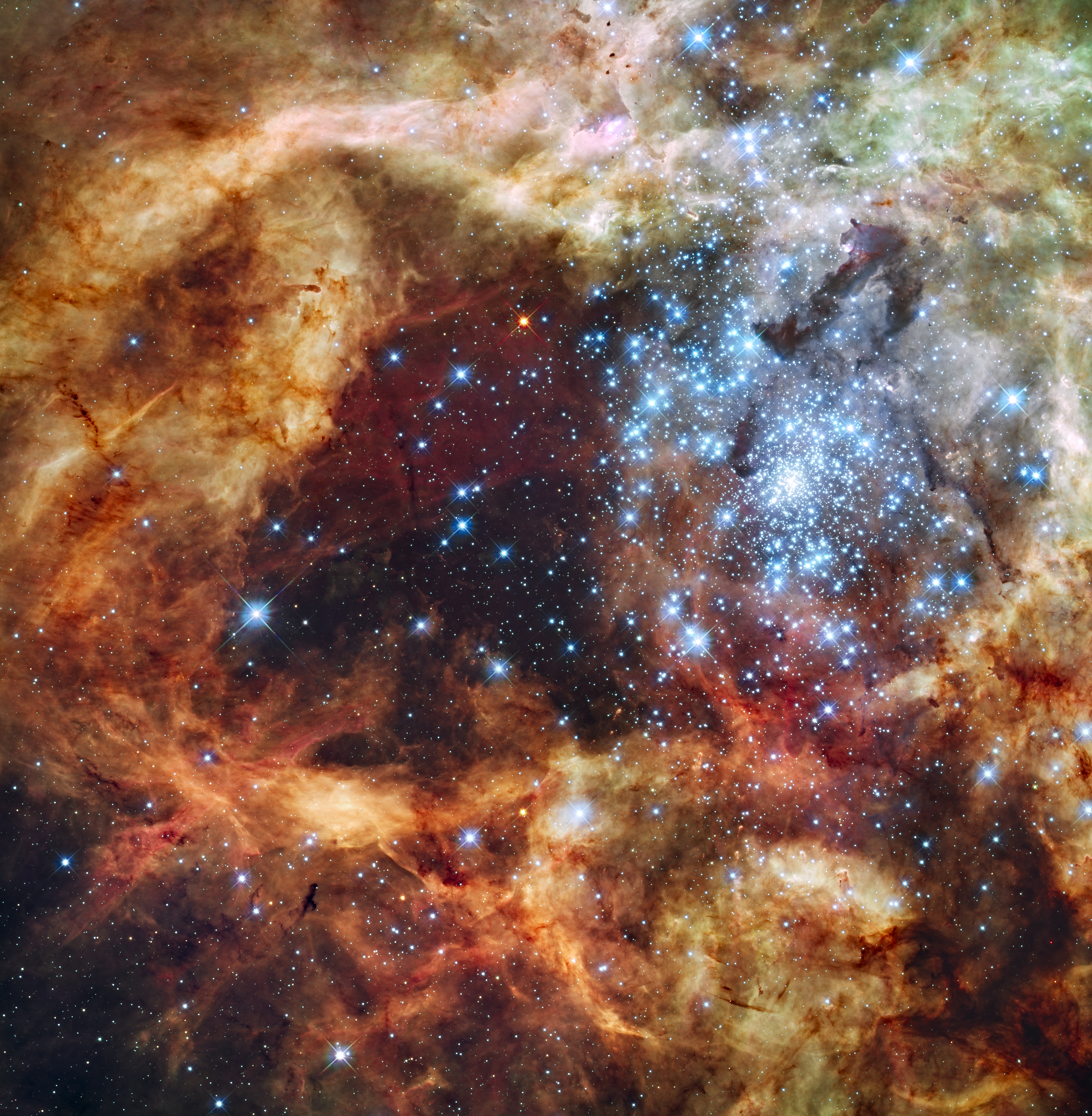
R136 in NGC 2070, with Mk 34 just to the left of the central concentration

The two components of Mk34 have identical spectral classes of WN5h, having spectra with prominent emission lines of highly-ionised helium, nitrogen, and carbon. The h suffix indicates that the spectrum also contains lines of hydrogen which are not usually seen in Wolf-Rayet spectra. The strength of the helium emission lines in the spectrum shows that the outer layers of the star consist of 35% helium.

The WN5 spectral class indicates an extremely high photospheric temperature. Modelling the profiles of several spectral lines gives an effective temperature of 53,000 K for each star. The primary star has a bolometric luminosity of about 2,000,000 L_{☉} and a radius of about 19 R_{☉}, while the secondary has a luminosity of about 1,600,000 L_{☉} and a radius of about 18 R_{☉}.

The masses of the two components inferred from their spectra are about 148 M_{☉} and 135 M_{☉} respectively. The masses determined from the orbit of the stars depends strongly on the inclination of the orbit, which is poorly known. The best match with the observed masses is found for orbits with an inclination near 50°.

The emission line spectra of the two stars in the Mk34 system are caused by strong mass loss which produces a dense stellar wind. Both stars have a stellar wind with a velocity of about 2500 km/s causing each star to lose more than the mass of the sun every 10,000 years, a billion times stronger than the sun's wind.

== Evolution ==
Although Wolf-Rayet stars are typically old stars that have lost their outer layers of hydrogen, some are very young massive stars which still contain hydrogen. Both stars in the Mk34 system are very young, and the helium, carbon, and nitrogen fusion products in their spectra are produced by the strong convection that occurs in massive main sequence stars and by rotational mixing. The stars are rotating at about 240 km/s and 250 km/s respectively.

Modelling the evolution of the stars gives ages of about 500,000 years, with current masses of about 139 M_{☉} and 127 M_{☉} respectively, and initial masses of 144 M_{☉} and 131 M_{☉} respectively. These are similar to the masses deduced from observation. The stars are expected to have a hydrogen-burning lifetime of about 2.2 Myr, and are not expected to experience significant mass exchange during their evolution. Both stars should reach core collapse with masses too high to produce a normal supernova. Instead they are likely to produce a weak supernova followed by collapse to a black hole, or directly collapse to a black hole with no visible explosion.
