= HD 38282 =

Massive binary star in the constellation Dorado

Observation data Epoch J2000 Equinox ICRS
- Constellation: Dorado
- Right ascension: 05^{h} 38^{m} 53.3783^{s}
- Declination: −69° 02′ 00.896″
- Apparent magnitude (V): 11.11

Characteristics
- Evolutionary stage: Wolf Rayet
- Spectral type: WN5-6h + WN6-7h
- B−V color index: −0.13

Astrometry
Radial velocity (R_{v})	267.5±52.5 km/s
Proper motion (μ)	RA: 2.033 mas/yr Dec.: 0.926 mas/yr
Parallax (π)	0.0107±0.0226 mas
Distance	163,000 ly (49,970 pc)
Absolute magnitude (M_{V})	−7.96

Details
Mass	80-170 + 95-205 M_{☉}
Luminosity	4,500,000 – 6,300,000 L_{☉}
Temperature	47,000 K
Age	<2 Myr

Other designations
- Brey 89, BAT99 118, RMC 144, R144, CPD−69°462, 2MASS J05385338-6902007, HD 38282, GSC 09163-00992,

Database references
SIMBAD	data

HD 38282 (R144, BAT99-118, Brey 89) is a massive spectroscopic binary star in the Tarantula Nebula (Large Magellanic Cloud), consisting of two hydrogen-rich Wolf-Rayet stars.

R144 is located near the R136 cluster at the center of NGC 2070 and may have been ejected from it after an encounter with another massive binary. It shares a common X-ray cavity with the R146 (HD 269926) and R147 (HD 38344) Wolf-Rayet star systems.

Both components of R144 are detected in the spectrum and both are WNh stars, very hot stars with strong emission lines due to their strong stellar winds. The orbit has not been determined, but is likely to be between two and six months long, possibly more if it is eccentric. The primary, slightly hotter, star is observed to be the less massive of the two.

Each star is amongst the most luminous known, but the exact parameters of each has not been determined. Their combined luminosity is around 4,500,000 L_{☉} to 6,300,000 L_{☉}. The masses have not yet been calculated accurately from the orbital parameters, but the stars have been modelled to initially have been around 260 M_{☉} and 175 M_{☉}. Depending on their exact age, this has now decreased to between 80 M_{☉} and 170 M_{☉} for the primary and 95 M_{☉} and 205 M_{☉} for the secondary.

== See also ==
- List of most massive stars
