= R99 =

R99 may refer to:

- R99 (New York City Subway car)
- R99 (star)
- Embraer R-99, a Brazilian Air Force military aircraft
- Hydrotreated vegetable oil, a sustainable fuel
- HMS Urchin (R99), a destroyer of the Royal Navy
- French aircraft carrier Foch
- R99, a NIOSH air filtration rating for respirators
