= Collinder 228 =

Open cluster

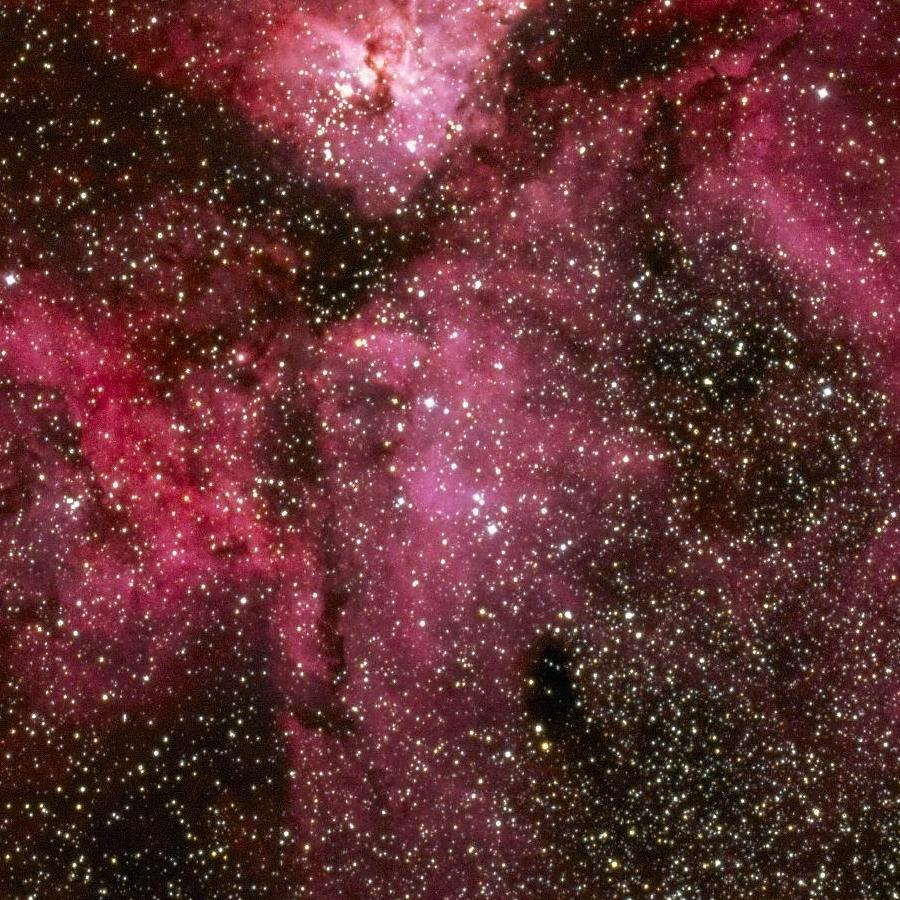

Observation data (J2000 epoch)
- Right ascension: 10^{h} 44^{m} 00.0^{s}
- Declination: −60° 05′ 12″
- Distance: 10,000 ly
- Apparent magnitude (V): 4.4
- Apparent dimensions (V): 14

Physical characteristics
- Other designations: OCl 828.0, MWSC 1845, C 1041-597, KPR2004b 262

Associations
- Constellation: Carina

Collinder 228 is an open cluster within the southern part of the Carina Nebula NGC 3372, about 25' south of η Carinae. It is probably composed of stars which recently formed from the material in the nebula. QZ Carinae is the brightest member of Collinder 228 with an apparent magnitude between 6.16–6.49.

Prominent stars in Collinder 228
Star name	FMF number	Effective temperature	Absolute magnitude	Bolometric magnitude	Mass (M_{☉})	Spectral type	Ref.
WR 24 (HD 93131)	3	50100	−7.34	−11.4	114	WN6ha-w	
QZ Car (HD 93206)	33	30400 + 20000 + 34000 + 32900	−9.2 + 3 + 8.5 + 7	−10.6	27.1 + 6.5 + 25.4 + 17.1	O9.7I + B2V + O8III + O9V	
HD 93632	92	45400	−6.1	−10.2	76	O5III(f)	
V661 Car (HD 93130)	1	39900	−6.3	−10.1	68	O7II(f)	
HD 305525	98	43600	−5.7	−9.8	58	O6V	
	97	46100	−4.8	−9	47	O5V	
HD 93146		42400	−5.1	−9.1	44	O6.5V((f))	
HD 305524	7	41000	−5.2	−9.1	42	O7V((f))	
HD 93222	6	37200	−5.7	−9.3	42	O8III((f))	
HD 305523	32	35700	−5.6	−9.1	38	O8.5III	
HD 305532	38	43600	−4.4	−8.5	38	O6V((f))	
HD 305438	24	38500	−4.6	−8.4	32	O8V	
HD 93028	27	35700	−4.9	−8.4	30	O8.5III	
HD 305518	22	34700	−5	−8.3	29	O9.5V	
HD 93027	14	36000	−4.8	−8.3	29	O9V	
	39	37200	−4.6	−8.2	29	O8.5V((f))	
HD 305539	94	37200	−4.4	−8.1	28	O8.5V	
	67	36000	−4.7	−8.2	28	O9V	
HD 93576	93	36000	−4.7	−8.2	28	O9V	
	21	37200	−4.2	−7.8	27	O8.5V	
HD 305536	5	34700	−4.7	−8.1	26	O9.5V	
	66	34700	−3.9	−7.3	22	O9.5V	
	12	20900	−6.1	−8	20	B2.5Ia:	

== See also ==
- List of most massive stars
