= Arches Cluster =

Densest star cluster known

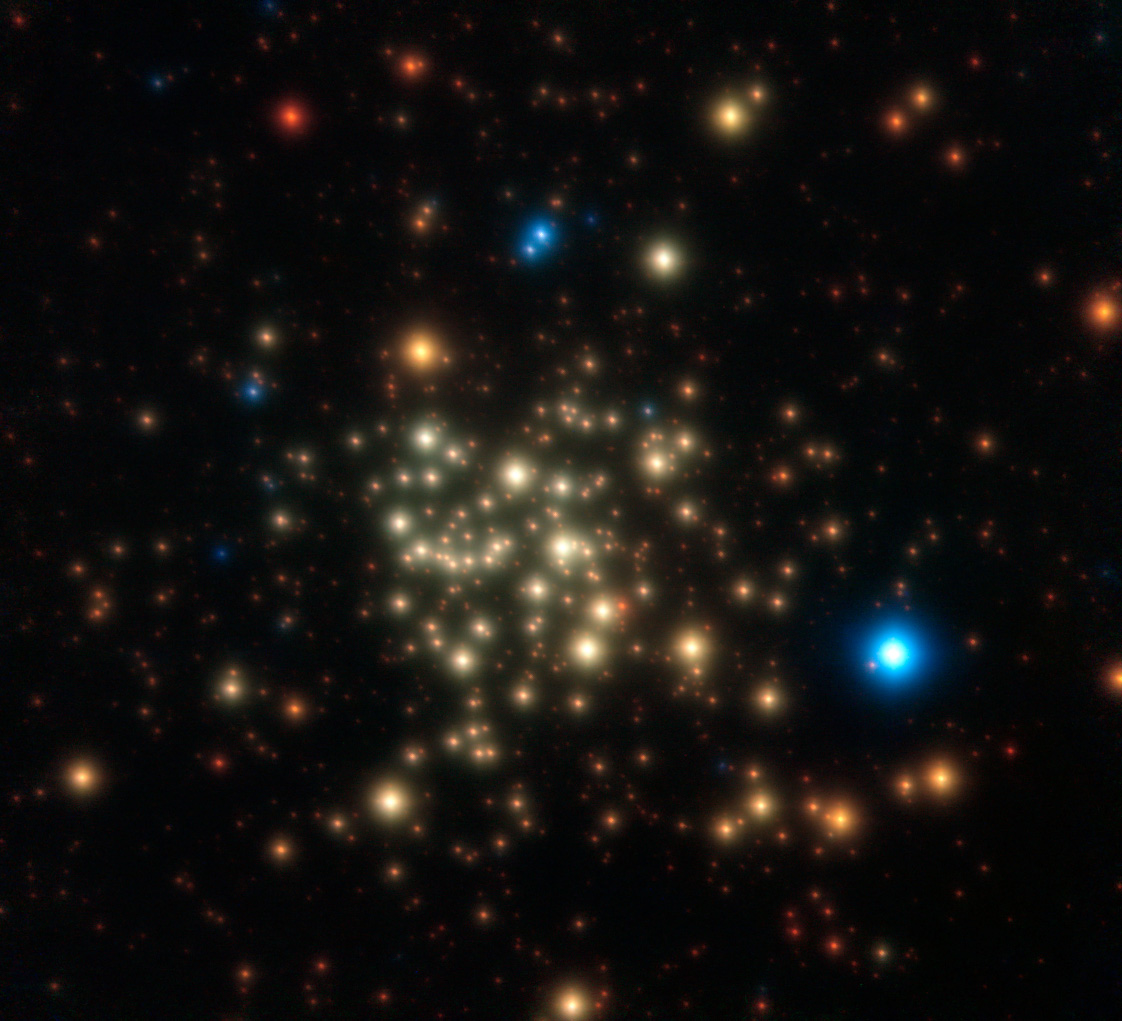
- Arches Cluster in J, H, and K infrared bands (NACO adaptive optics on ESO’s Very Large Telescope)

Observation data (J2000 epoch)
- Right ascension: 17^{h} 45^{m} 50.5^{s}
- Declination: –28° 49′ 28″
- Distance: 25 kly (8.5 kpc)

Physical characteristics
- Estimated age: 2.5 million years
- Optically obscured

Associations
- Constellation: Sagittarius

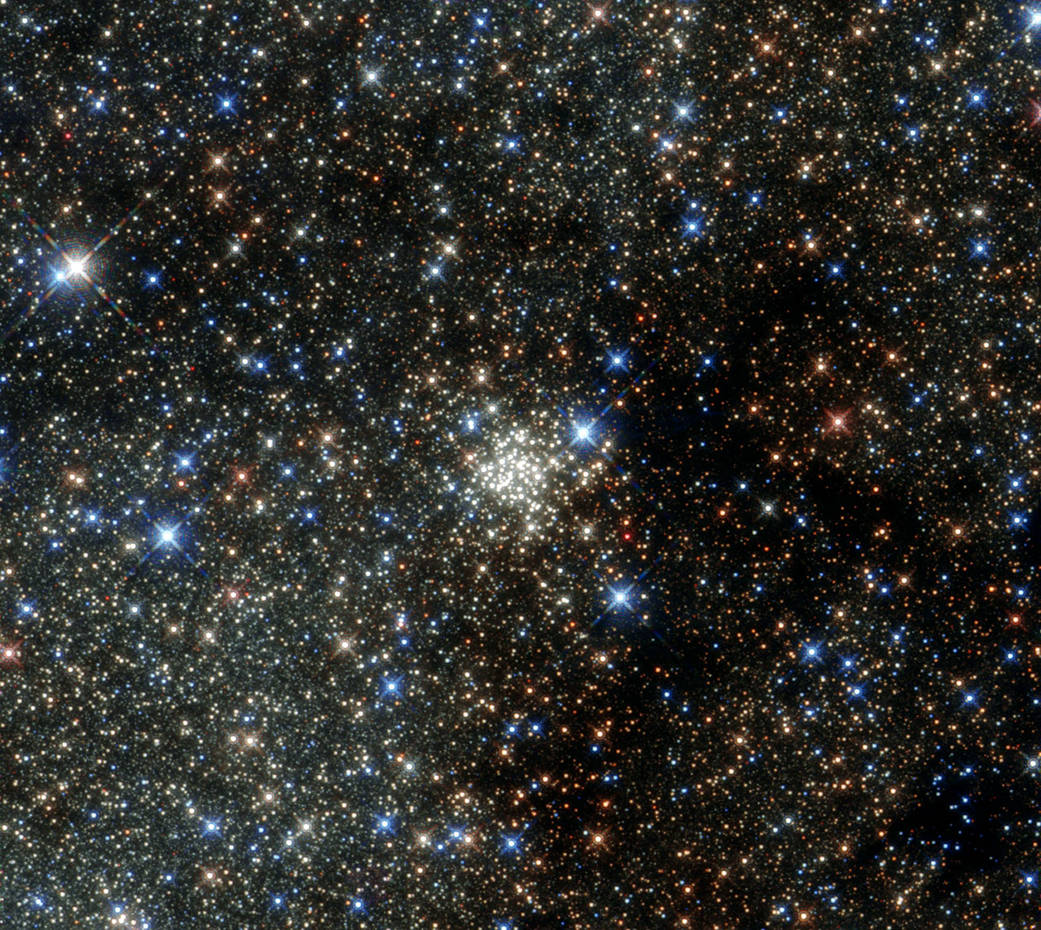
Arches Cluster in infrared (NASA/ESA Hubble Space Telescope)

The Arches Cluster is one of the densest star clusters in the Milky Way, about 100 light-years from its center in the constellation Sagittarius (The Archer), 25,000 light-years from Earth. Its discovery was reported by Nagata et al. in 1995, and independently by Cotera et al. in 1996. Due to extremely heavy optical extinction by dust in this region, the cluster is obscured in the visual bands, and is observed in the X-ray, infrared and radio bands. It is therefore classified as an infrared cluster. It contains approximately 135 young, very hot stars that are many times larger and more massive than the Sun, plus many thousands of less massive stars.

The star cluster is estimated to be around two and a half million years old. Although larger and denser than the nearby Quintuplet Cluster, it appears to be slightly younger. Only stars earlier and more massive than O5 have evolved away from the main sequence, while the Quintuplet Cluster includes a number of hot supergiants as well as a red supergiant and three luminous blue variables.

The most prominent members of the Arches Cluster are hot emission line stars: thirteen Wolf–Rayet stars, all massive hydrogen-rich types; and eight class O hypergiants. One of these is an eclipsing binary with a Wolf–Rayet primary and a class O supergiant secondary. X-ray emission from the cluster suggests that many other members are also in close binary systems with two hot luminous members, but there is little evidence of the evolution of these stars being affected by binary mass exchange. The spectral classes and their properties merge smoothly from the main sequence to normal class O giants and supergiants, to class O hypergiants, to the presumed most evolved Wolf–Rayets. One star is intermediate between WN8–9h and O4–6 Ia^{+}. There are no cooler evolved stars.

Work by Donald Figer, an astronomer at the Rochester Institute of Technology, suggests that 150 solar masses (M_{☉}) is the upper limit of stellar mass in the current era of the universe. He used the Hubble Space Telescope to observe about a thousand stars in the Arches cluster and found no stars over that limit, despite a statistical expectation that there should be several. However, later research demonstrated a very high sensitivity of the calculated star masses upon the extinction laws used for mass derivation, which can affect the upper mass limit by about 30% using different extinction laws (possibly from 150 M_{☉} to about 100 M_{☉}). The limit of 150 solar masses was previously deduced by Carsten Weidner & Pavel Kroupa using observations of the cluster R136.

Prominent stars
B=Blum F=Figer	WR#	Spectral type	Luminosity (L_{☉})	Temperature (effective, K)	Mass (M_{☉})	Radius (R_{☉})
B1	102bc	WN8–9h	891,000	31,700	50–60	32
F1	102ad	WN8–9h	2,000,000	33,200	101–119	43
F2	102aa	WN8–9h; O5–6 Ia^{+}	1,000,000	33,500	80; 60	30
F3	102bb	WN8–9h	1,260,000	29,600	52–63	43
F4	102al	WN7–8h	2,000,000	36,800	66–76	35
F5	102ai	WN8–9h	891,000	32,100	31–36	31
F6	102ah	WN8–9h	2,240,000	33,900	101–119	44
F7	102aj	WN8–9h	2,000,000	32,900	86–102	44
F8	102ag	WN8–9h	1,260,000	32,900	43–51	35
F9	102ae	WN8–9h	2,240,000	36,600	111–131	38
F10	102ab	O7–8 Ia^{+}	891,000	32,200	55–69	24
F12	102af	WN7–8h	1,580,000	36,900	70–82	31
F14	102ba	WN8–9h	1,000,000	34,500	54–65	28
F15		O6–7 Ia^{+}	1,410,000	35,600	80–97	32
F16	102ak	WN8–9h	794,000	32,200	46–56	29
F17	102ac	O5–6 Ia^{+}				
F18		O4–5 Ia^{+}	1,120,000	36,900	67–82	26
F20		O4–5 Ia	794,000	38,200	47–57	21
F21		O4–6I	891,000	35,800	56–70	25
F22		O4–6I	630,000	35,800	41–53	21
F23		O4–6I	630,000	35,800	41–52	21
F25		O4–5I	851,000	40,000		19
F26		O4–6I	707,000	39,800	45–57	18
F28		O4–6I	891,000	39,800	57–72	20
F29		O4–6I	562,000	35,700	36–45	20
F32		O4–6I	707,000	40,800	47–59	17
F33		O4–6I	707,000	39,800	45–57	18
F34		O4–6I	562,000	38,100	36–46	18
F35		O4–6I	501,000	33,800	34–43	21
F40		O4–5 Ia^{+}	562,000	39,500	57–72	16

== See also ==
- List of most massive stars
