= NGC 2074 =

Emission nebula in the constellation Dorado

Emission nebula
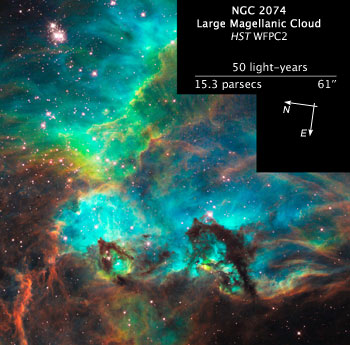
- Composite of separate exposures made by the WFPC2 on the Hubble Space Telescope. Red shows emissions from sulphur atoms, green from glowing hydrogen, and blue from glowing oxygen.

Observation data: J2000 epoch
- Right ascension: 05^{h} 39^{m} 03.0^{s}
- Declination: −69° 29′ 54″
- Distance: 170,000 ly (52,000 pc)
- Constellation: Dorado
- Designations: GC 1272, JH 2942

NGC 2074 is a magnitude ~8 emission nebula in the Tarantula Nebula located in the constellation Dorado. It was discovered on 3 August 1826 by James Dunlop and around 1835 by John Herschel. It is described as being "pretty bright, pretty large, much extended, [and having] 5 stars involved".

== Discovery ==
Some of the objects catalogued by Herschel before 1847 do not have a discovery date listed, and NGC 2074 is one of them. Though its inclusion in the catalog of objects observed in the Large Magellanic Cloud which involves observations carried out between 2 November 1836 and 26 March 1837 shows it must not have been discovered later than that.

The observation of NGC 2074 by Dunlop was not identified as this object until recently.

== Location ==
NGC 2074 is located around 170,000 light-years (1.1×10^{10} AU) away. The area has a lot of raw stellar creation, possibly triggered by a nearby supernova explosion and is on the edge of a dark molecular cloud which is an incubator for the birth of new stars.
