= Cygnus OB9 =

Asterism

Observation data (J2000.0 epoch)
- Right ascension: 20^{h} 21^{m} 00.0^{s}
- Declination: 39° 54′ 00″
- Distance: 5,000 ly
- Apparent magnitude (V): 7.7

Physical characteristics

Associations
- Constellation: Cygnus

Cygnus OB9 is an OB association in Cygnus. It is near to the Cygnus OB2 association. The region is embedded within a wider one of star formation known as Cygnus X, which is one of the most luminous objects in the sky at radio wavelengths. The region is approximately 5,000 light years from Earth in the constellation of Cygnus.

Although Cygnus OB9 has many O and B type stars, Cygnus OB9 is also hidden behind a massive dust cloud known as the Cygnus Rift like Cygnus OB2.

Prominent stars
Star name	Spectral type	M_{V}	Temperature (K)	Mass (M_{☉})
V2245 Cygni (HD 229196)	O5	−6.19	40,862	61.6
ALS 11244	O5If	−5.42	38,612	40.1
BD+39 4177	O6.5	−5.51	37,870	39.3
HD 229250	O7	−5.28	36,872	33.9
BD+39 4168	O7	−5.40	36,872	37.3
HD 229202	O8V	−4.66	34,877	25.0
HD 228929	B0.5Ib	−5.60	22,537	20.5
HD 193945	B0Vnn	−5.11	30,110	23.8
RIC 13431720	B1Ia	−5.91	19,979	20.5
HD 193426	B9Ia	−6.71	10,500	15.4

== See also ==
- List of most massive stars
