= NGC 1858 =

Open cluster in the constellation Dorado

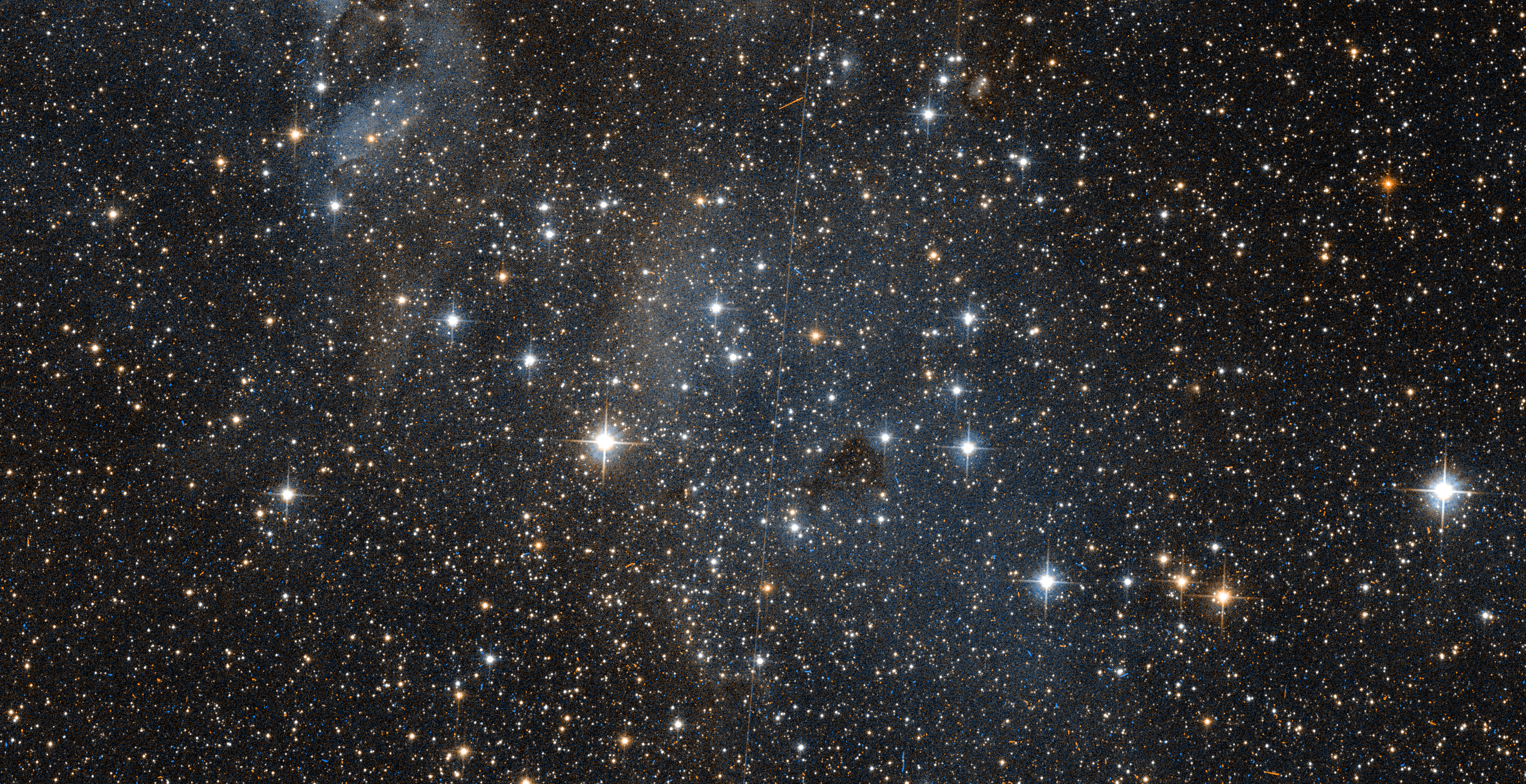
- The open cluster NGC 1858

Observation data (J2000 epoch)
- Right ascension: 05^{h} 09^{m} 51.9^{s}
- Declination: −68° 53′ 28″
- Apparent magnitude (V): 9.9 (visible) 9.8 (B-Band)

Physical characteristics
- Estimated age: 8 million
- Other designations: ESO 56-SC74, Dunlop 120

Associations
- Constellation: Dorado

NGC 1858 (also known as ESO 56-SC74) is a bright, large, irregular open cluster and emission nebula. It is found in the constellation Dorado. It is located in the Large Magellanic Cloud. It was first discovered by James Dunlop on August 3, 1826, and was first recorded as Dunlop 120. John Herschel recorded it on November 2, 1834. However, at the time, he did not associate it with Dunlop 120. Astronomers have now realised that Dunlop 120 and NGC 1858 are the same object.

== See also ==
- List of most massive stars
