= NGC 2001 =

Open cluster in the constellation Dorado

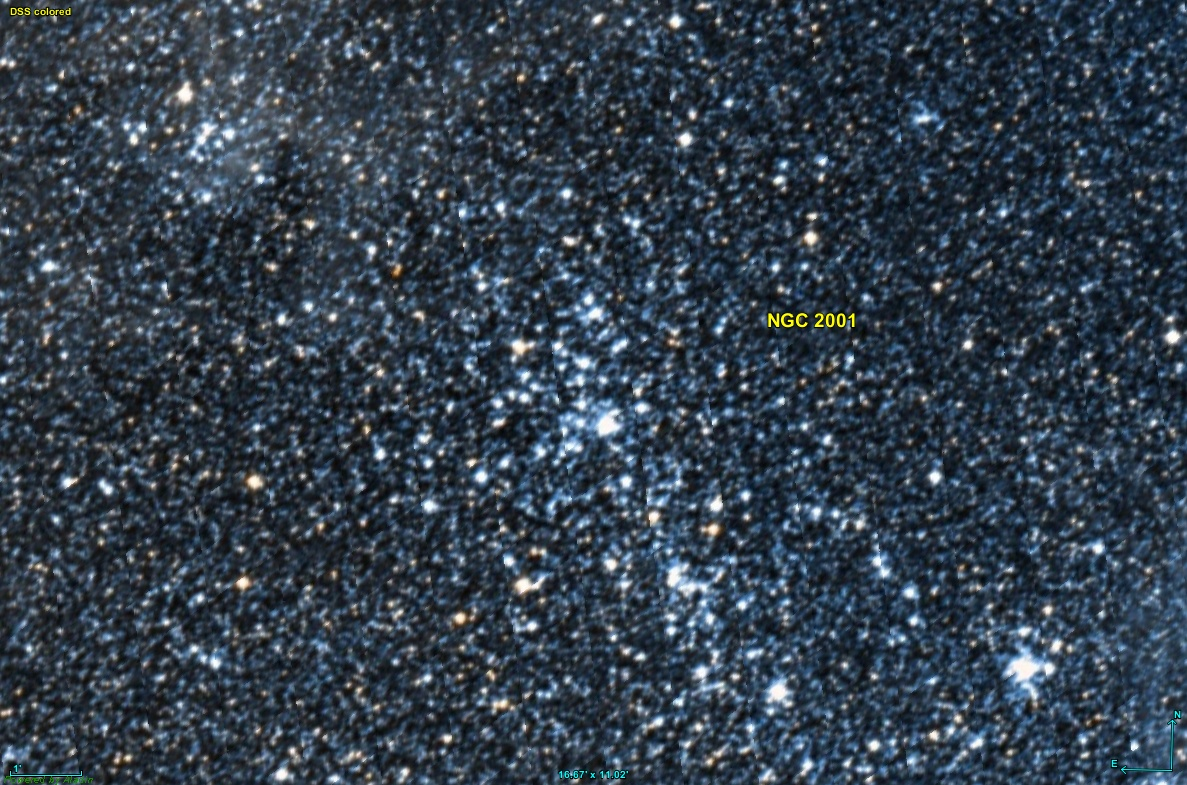
- Image of NGC 2001

Observation data (J2000 epoch)
- Right ascension: 05^{h} 29^{m} 10.0^{s}
- Declination: −68° 47′ 02″

Physical characteristics
- Other designations: PGC 3518062, ESO 056-SC137, SL 507 and part of LH 64

Associations
- Constellation: Dorado

NGC 2001 (also known as PGC 3518062, 056-SC137, SL 507 and part of LH 64) is an open cluster located in the constellation Dorado and is part of the Large Magellanic Cloud.

== Background ==
NGC 2001 was discovered by James Dunlop on September 27, 1826. Its apparent size is 7 by 3.5 arc minutes, and is also known as GC 1204, h 2888, Dunlop 178. However, Wolfgang Steinicke lists this as Dunlop 136, not Dunlop 178.

NGC 2001 is around 160 to 165 thousand light years distant, and the loose grouping of stars is about 330 to 335 light years across. It is also listed as part of Lucke-Hodge stellar association 64, along with ANONb4 and e135.
