= R99 (star) =

Star in the Large Magellanic cloud

Observation data Epoch J2000 Equinox ICRS
- Constellation: Dorado
- Right ascension: 05^{h} 22^{m} 59.809^{s}
- Declination: −68° 01′ 46.57″
- Apparent magnitude (V): 11.46

Characteristics
- Spectral type: LBV
- U−B color index: −0.92
- B−V color index: +0.25
- Variable type: LBV

Astrometry
Radial velocity (R_{v})	293±16.2 km/s
Proper motion (μ)	RA: 3.4±2.5 mas/yr Dec.: −0.4±2.3 mas/yr
Distance	50,000 pc
Absolute magnitude (M_{V})	−8.48

Details
Mass	103 M_{☉}
Radius	74.8 R_{☉}
Luminosity	3.2×10^{6} L_{☉}
Temperature	28,000 K

Other designations
- HD 269445, BAT99-33, AAVSO 0523-68, 2MASS J05225978-6801466

Database references
SIMBAD	data

R99 (HD 269445) is a star in the Large Magellanic Cloud in the constellation Dorado. It is classified as a possible luminous blue variable and is one of the most luminous and massive stars known.

R99 has a peculiar spectrum that has been described as OBf:pe, "unclassifiable", peculiar WN10, "similar to the unusual LBV HD 5980", "unique", and Ofpe/WN9. The Ofpe/WN9 type remains even though other stars of this type have been reclassified to types between WN9 and WN11. R99 has significant differences from those other stars which preclude it being given a simple WN spectral type: the ultraviolet spectrum is strongly blanketed over a different range of wavelengths; highly ionised iron lines are seen in absorption instead of emission; the Hi lines are unusually narrow and have no P Cygni profile; a lack of any significant absorption features near H_{δ}; a number of metal lines are unusually strong or weak compared to other stars of the type; there is a small unexplained infrared excess.

The wind structure of R99 may be significantly different from most WR stars and LBVs. The normal temperature-stratified WR wind is accelerated to terminal velocity, causing lines of different ionisation levels of Helium to be created at different distances from the star. This does not seem to apply to R99. Significant polarisation of the spectrum continuum is also seen, suggesting an asymmetric wind. This has not been observed in other WR stars.

R99 shows brightness variations of about 0.3 magnitude over a period of decades, and smaller amplitudes with the strongest periods at two and ten days. The colour also varies, with the star being bluer at minimum light. It has been classified as a luminous blue variable on account of the variability and spectrum, although it has never been observed in outburst. Others still list it only as a candidate.

== See also ==
- List of most massive stars
