= WR 24 =

Wolf-Rayet star in the constellation Carina

- WR 24 (circled) in the Carina Nebula; Credit: ESO

Observation data Epoch J2000 Equinox ICRS
- Constellation: Carina
- Right ascension: 10^{h} 43^{m} 52.25894^{s}
- Declination: −60° 07′ 04.0215″
- Apparent magnitude (V): 6.48 - 6.50

Characteristics
- Evolutionary stage: Wolf–Rayet
- Spectral type: WN6ha-w
- U−B color index: −0.91
- B−V color index: −0.04
- Variable type: suspected

Astrometry
Proper motion (μ)	RA: −6.649 mas/yr Dec.: +1.593 mas/yr
Parallax (π)	0.2398±0.0344 mas
Distance	approx. 14,000 ly (approx. 4,200 pc)
Absolute magnitude (M_{V})	–7.34

Details
Mass	114 M_{☉}
Radius	21.73 R_{☉}
Luminosity (bolometric)	2,950,000 L_{☉}
Temperature	50,100 K

Other designations
- WR 24, HD 93131, HIP 52488, NSV 18148, CD−59°3272, 2MASS J10435225-6007040, Hen 3-477

Database references
SIMBAD	data

WR 24 (HD 93131) is a Wolf-Rayet star in the constellation Carina. It is one of the most luminous stars known. At the edge of naked eye visibility it is also one of the brightest Wolf Rayet stars in the sky.

The spectrum of WR 24 has the characteristic strong nitrogen and helium emission lines of a WN star, but also lines of hydrogen that show Doppler-displaced absorption components. The lowest ionisation nitrogen emission lines are strongest, with N_{V} lines being very weak. The He_{I} lines are weaker than the He_{II} lines, leading to a WN6ha spectral class. The spectral type is annotated with a letter w, indicating weaker emission than for a typical WN6 star.

WR 24 is thought to be a member of the open cluster Collinder 228, sometimes considered to be just an extension of the rich cluster Trumpler 16. It lies on the southwestern side of the Carina Nebula. Collinder 228 and the Carina Nebula are approximately 2.2 kpc away. However, the Gaia Data Release 2 parallax gives a distance around 4200 for WR 24.

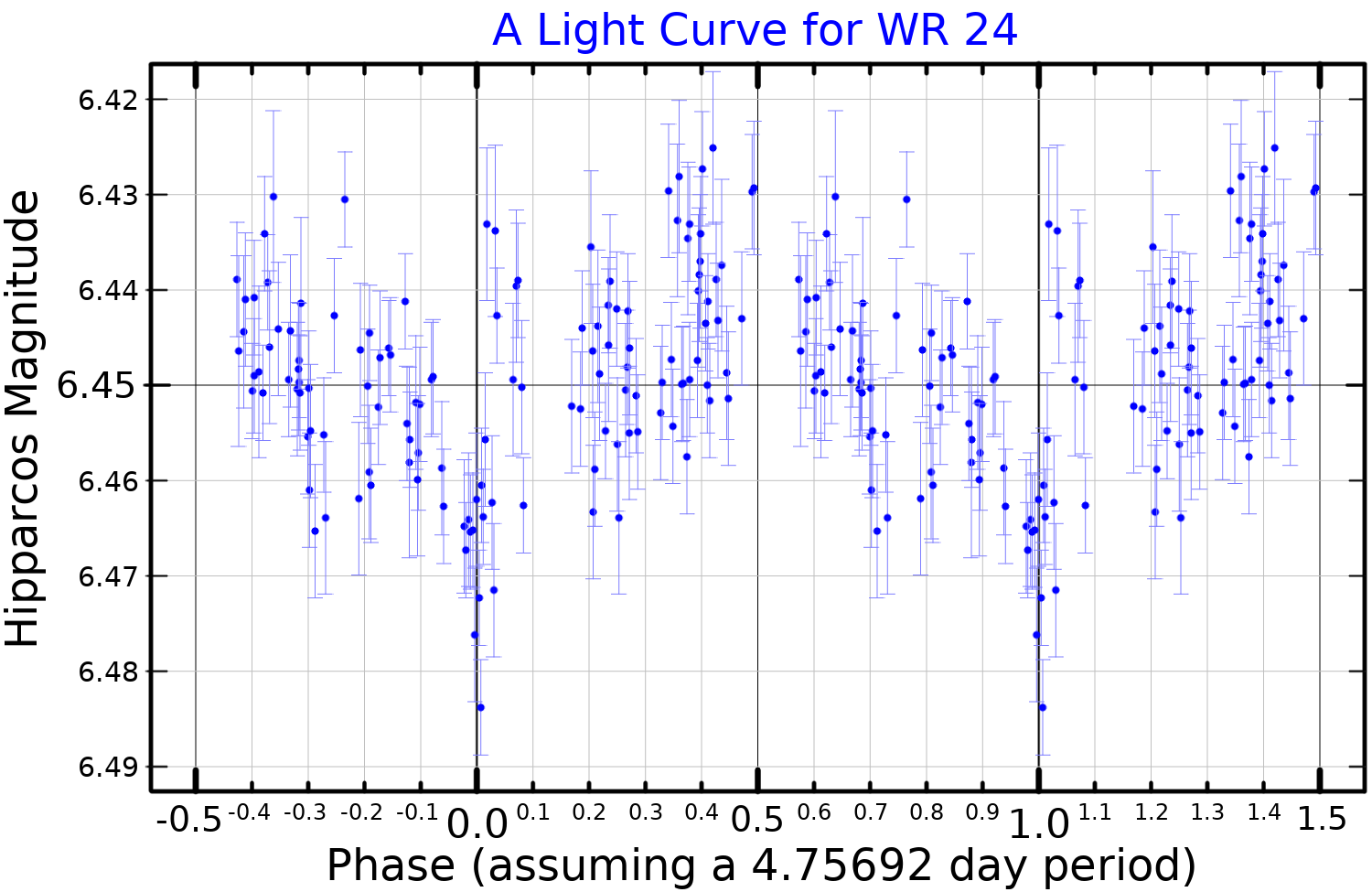
A light curve for WR 24, plotted from Hipparcos data

WR 24 has been reported to vary in brightness by about 0.02 magnitudes. Analysis of Hipparcos photometry shows an amplitude of 0.082 magnitudes and a primary period of 4.76 days. It has not yet been assigned a variable star designation in the General Catalogue of Variable Stars and is still formally listed as a suspected variable.

The hydrogen-rich WN stars have been referred to as WNL stars or as WNH stars since they do not necessarily have late nitrogen-sequence spectra. They are systematically more massive and more luminous than stars with similar spectra but lacking nitrogen. WR 24 has a mass of 114 M_{☉} and is nearly three million times as luminous as the sun. These stars are proposed to be young hydrogen-burning stars, effectively main sequence objects, rather than post-supergiant stars. WR 24 is calculated to have 44% hydrogen in its atmosphere. The cluster Collinder 228 is thought to be around 6.78 million years old. The WR-type spectra are caused because helium and nitrogen and convected to the surface by the extreme temperature gradients caused by the CNO cycle in the core, and then expelled by powerful stellar winds. WR 24 has a wind reducing its mass by 40×10^{−6} M_{☉} per year, at a velocity of 2,160 km/s.

== See also ==
- List of most massive stars
