= Westerhout 51 =

Star formation region

Nebula
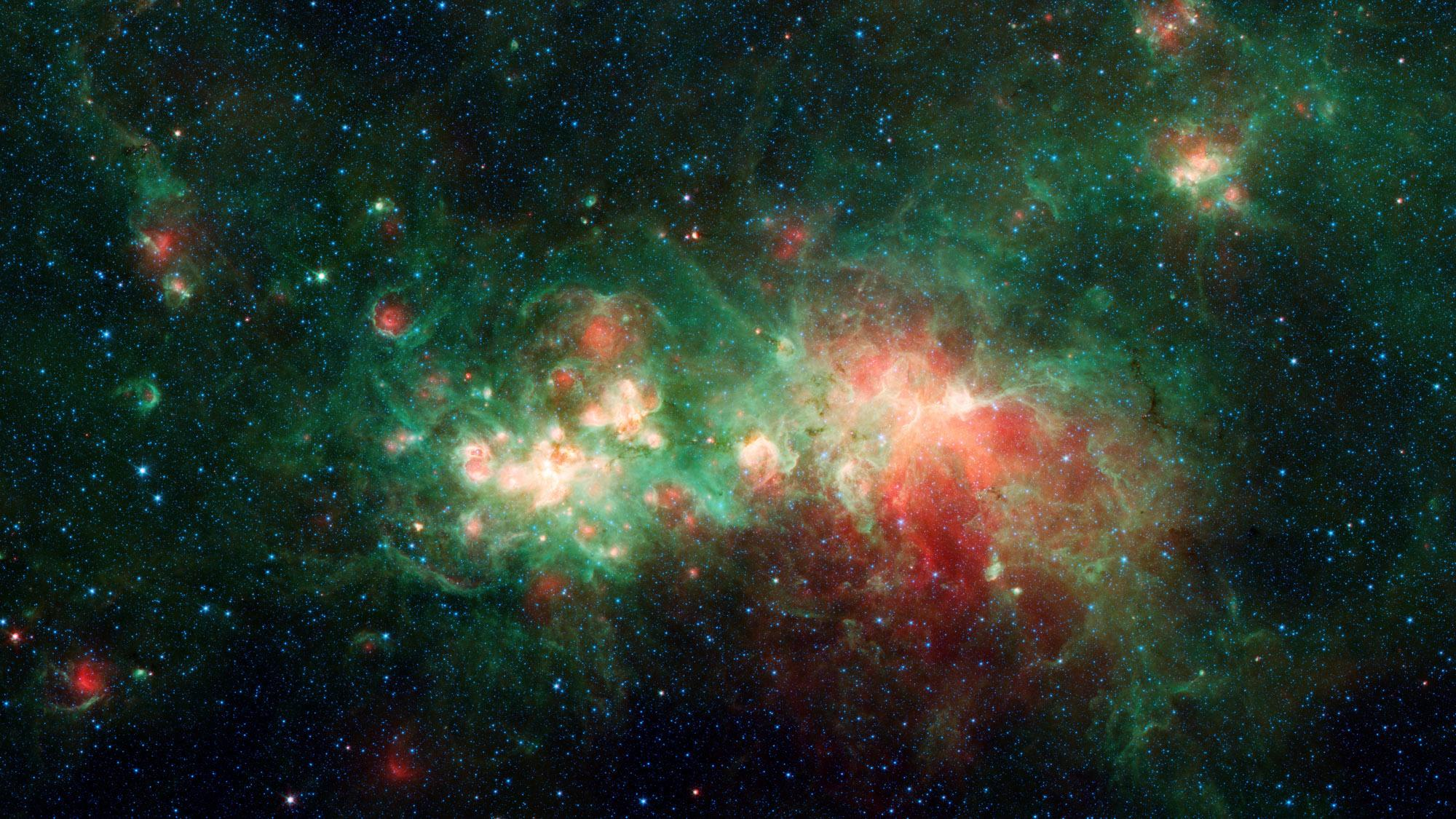
- Spitzer Space Telescope Image of Westerhout 51

Observation data
- Distance: 17,000 ly
- Constellation: Sagittarius
- Notable features: Intense star formation

Westerhout 51, or simply W51, is a massive star formation region in the Milky Way galaxy located 17,000 light years from Earth in the constellation of Sagittarius. It is one of the most active regions of star formation in the galaxy, forming many O-type stars. It can be split up into three points of interest: two star formation regions named W51A and W51B, along with a supernova remnant named W51C. The region has copious amounts of molecular gas totaling ~6x10^5 solar masses. Much of the gas has been observed traveling up to 20 kilometers per second.

The region is almost invisible in visible light despite the equivalent of 20 million suns in emissions. This is due to large amounts of interstellar gas blocking the light, making it visible only in radio and infrared light.

== Components ==
=== W51A ===
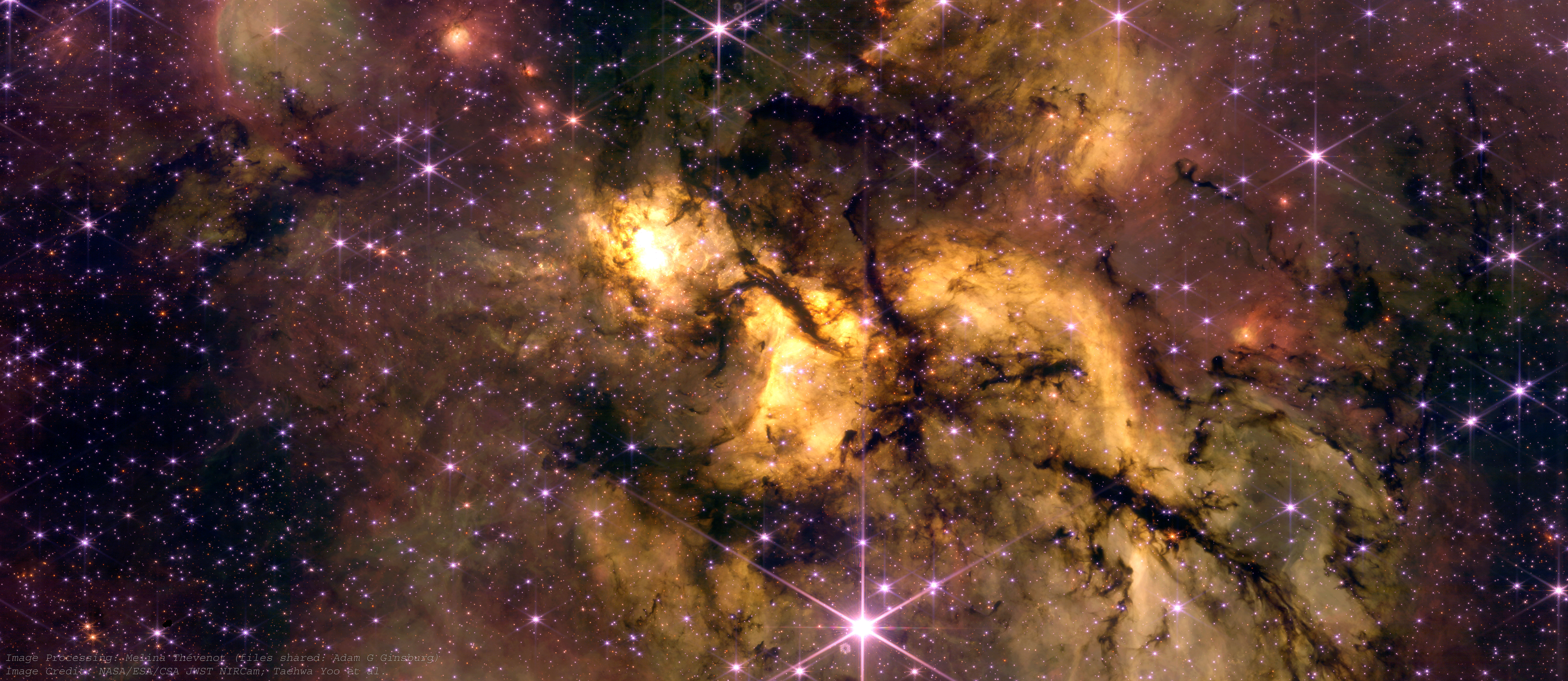
W51A with the James Webb Space Telescope's NIRCam with IRS 2 being located in the yellow circular cloud in the middle. W51-E is inside the large yellow crescent in the lower half of the middle.

Westerhout 51A is a star formation region within W51. Towards its center there is a Hll region known as G49.5-0.4. Another region known as G49.57−0.27 is located ~15 parsecs north. W51A contains two notable bright star clusters named IRS 1 and IRS 2. Also within W51A are four concentrated clumps of gas all within a relatively small area of 5 parsecs.

This region came as a result of collisions between molecular clouds over a scale of 0.1 million years. This led to massive amounts of star formation.

A detailed study of the region was performed with the James Webb Space Telescope's NIRCam and MIRI, observing the massive protoclusters W51-E and IRS2. The study showed that polycyclic aromatic hydrocarbons are destroyed in ionized regions of this star-forming region. It revealed converging filaments feeding W51-E and cavities around IRS2. Gas is still accreting onto W51-E, but a feedback from W51-IRS2 is suppressing further gas infall. Only 24 sources are detected in both JWST and ALMA, or about 10% of the ~200 sources detected with ALMA alone. This shows that many of the protostars are still surrounded by a dense envelope or dust in the line of sight, which hides them from view.

A knot north of IRS2 seen in molecular hydrogen and iron [Fe II] is likely the most energetic example of a protostellar jet driven by a massive star and impacting dense interstellar medium.

=== W51B ===
This is a star formation region located in Westerhout 51.

=== W51C ===
This is a supernova remnant located in Westerhout 51.
