= NGC 2060 =

Star cluster in the constellation Dorado

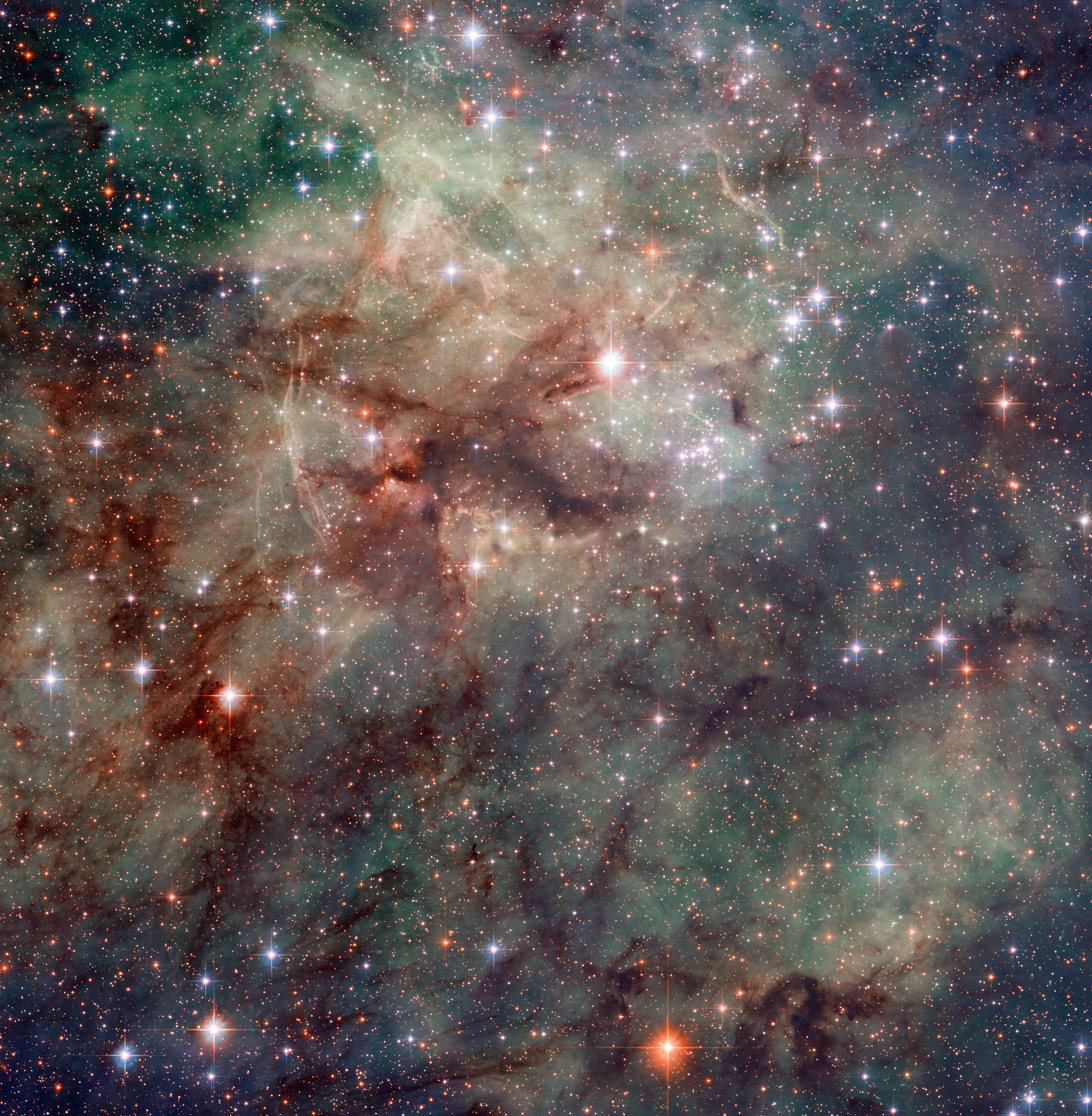
- An image of NGC 2060 taken by Hubble Space Telescope; Credit: NASA, ESA

Observation data (J2000.0 epoch)
- Right ascension: 05^{h} 37^{m} 51.6^{s}
- Declination: −69° 10′ 23″
- Distance: 160,000 ly (50,000 pc)
- Apparent magnitude (V): 9.59

Physical characteristics

Associations
- Constellation: Dorado

NGC 2060 is a star cluster within the Tarantula Nebula in the Large Magellanic Cloud, very close to the larger NGC 2070 cluster containing R136. It was discovered by John Herschel in 1836. It is a loose cluster approximately 10 million years old, within one of the Tarantula Nebula's superbubbles formed by the combined stellar winds of the cluster or by old supernovae.

NGC 2060 is often used synonymously for the supernova remnant N157B (30 Doradus B) which is a larger area of faint nebulosity and strong radio emission. The supernova occurred approximately 5000 years ago from our point of view. In 1998 a pulsar (named PSR J0537-6910) was discovered with the very fast rotation period of 16 milliseconds and the same approximate age as the supernova remnant. VFTS 102 is a runaway O-type main-sequence star found with NGC 2060, which is proposed to be a companion of the pulsar ejected at the time of the supernova explosion.

NGC 2060 has been identified as one of the few locations for OVz stars, stars with unusually strong He_{II} 468.6 nm absorption indicative of weak stellar winds and relatively low luminosity for the class. These stars are found in extremely young clusters and are thought to be a very early stage in the evolution of the most massive stars. They are also found in the much more massive NGC 2070 cluster nearby in the Tarantula Nebula.
