= QZ Carinae =

Star system in the constellation Carina

- QZ Carinae (circled) in the Carina Nebula; Credit: ESO

Observation data Epoch J2000 Equinox ICRS
- Constellation: Carina
- Right ascension: 10^{h} 44^{m} 22.91114^{s}
- Declination: −59° 59′ 35.9550″
- Apparent magnitude (V): 6.16 - 6.49

Characteristics
- Evolutionary stage: Blue supergiant (A1); Main sequence (A2 and B2); Blue giant (B1)
- Spectral type: A1: O9.7I; A2: B2V; B1: O8III; B2: O9V Ad: A3V
- U−B color index: −0.84
- B−V color index: +0.13
- Variable type: β Lyr

Astrometry
Radial velocity (R_{v})	−2.80 km/s
Proper motion (μ)	RA: −6.63 mas/yr Dec.: +2.48 mas/yr
Parallax (π)	1.67±0.40 mas
Distance	2,300 pc

Orbit
Primary	Aa
Secondary	Ac
Period (P)	14,403 days
Eccentricity (e)	0.204±0.040
Inclination (i)	96.8±8.1°
Longitude of the node (Ω)	147.6±6.5°
Periastron epoch (T)	50072±547
Argument of periastron (ω) (secondary)	265±12°

Orbit
Primary	Aa1
Secondary	Aa2
Period (P)	20.73 days
Eccentricity (e)	0.390±0.021
Inclination (i)	(assumed) 96.8±8.1°
Periastron epoch (T)	42529.23
Argument of periastron (ω) (secondary)	134.5±3.9°
Semi-amplitude (K_{1}) (primary)	50.6±1.6 km/s

Orbit
Primary	Ac1
Secondary	Ac2
Period (P)	5.999 days
Semi-major axis (a)	53.53±0.64 R_{☉}
Eccentricity (e)	(fixed) 0
Inclination (i)	87.8±0.8°
Semi-amplitude (K_{1}) (primary)	253.2±2.5 km/s

Details

Aa1
Mass	69.8 M_{☉}
Radius	22.1 R_{☉}
Luminosity	400,000 L_{☉}
Surface gravity (log g)	3.2 cgs
Temperature	30,463 K

Aa2
Mass	8.85 M_{☉}
Radius	3.0 R_{☉}
Luminosity	1,260 L_{☉}
Surface gravity (log g)	4.3 cgs
Temperature	20,000 K

Ac1
Mass	25.4 M_{☉}
Radius	13.7 R_{☉}
Luminosity	200,000 L_{☉}
Surface gravity (log g)	3.6 cgs
Temperature	33,961 K

Ac2
Mass	33.2 M_{☉}
Radius	7.53 R_{☉}
Luminosity	50,100 L_{☉}
Surface gravity (log g)	3.92 cgs
Temperature	32,882 K

Ab
Mass	10-12 M_{☉}

Ad
Mass	2.0+0.2 −0.2 M_{☉}
Radius	1.72 R_{☉}
Luminosity	17.7 L_{☉}
Surface gravity (log g)	4.27 cgs
Temperature	8,896 K
Age	9.7 Myr

Other designations
- QZ Car, HD 93206, HIP 52526, CD−59 3287, GC 14784, SAO 238414, GSC 08626-02523

Database references
SIMBAD	data

QZ Carinae (HD 93206) is a multiple star system in the constellation Carina. It is the brightest member of the loose open cluster Collinder 228 and one of the brightest stars in the Carina Nebula. The apparent magnitude is variable from +6.16 to +6.49 with a period of 6 days.

== Description ==
A1/Aa1
Period = 20.72 d
A2/Aa2
Period 54.3 yr
B1/Ac1
Period 6.00 d
B2/Ac2
Sep. 0.7"
Ad
Sep. 1.0""
Ab
Sep. 2.6"
D/E

Hierarchy of components in the QZ Carinae system, omitting the distant J10444-6000 components

QZ Carinae is approximately 2,300 parsecs (7,500 light-years) from Earth in the Carina Nebula star-forming region.

QZ Carinae is a complex multiple star system made up of perhaps nine individual stars. Four massive luminous stars dominate the light output of the system. They form a quadruple system of two spectroscopic binaries: Aa (designated A1 and A2, or Aa1 and Aa2) and eclipsing binary Ac (designated B1 and B2 or Ac1 and Ac2).

The A1/A2 and B1/B2 pairs take no more than 25 years to orbit each other, while the A pair completes an orbit around each other every 20.7 days and the B pair every 6.0 days. The system is bright at x-ray wavelengths primarily due to colliding stellar winds in the two close pairs. Pair A1/A2 contributes the bulk of the x-ray luminosity.

In 2014, a survey looking for companions of O-type stars reported resolving the Aa/Ac pair at a separation of 26 mas. It also reported the long-known companions Ab, B and C at 1, 7.3, and 8.8″ respectively, as well as a faint component E at 2.58″. Detailed examination of the vicinity of QZ Carinae for faint companions revealed 19 individual sources close to QC Carinae, but most are likely to be unrelated. Components Ab and E are considered very likely to be physically associated with the QZ Carinae system, as well as a new component Ad at 729 mas. A 2022 paper described the system as containing nine components, including the widely-separated B and C, the very close Ab and Ad, and component E which they refer to as D.

== Components ==
QZ Carinae A1 (or Aa1) is a blue supergiant of spectral type O9.7I with around 70 times the Sun's mass that has expanded to 22 times the Sun's radius. With a surface temperature of 30,463 K, it is around 400,000 times as luminous as the Sun. Its partner A2 (or Aa2) is a blue-white main sequence star of spectral type B2V with around 9 times the Sun's mass and 3 times its radius. With a surface temperature of 20,000 K, it is around 1,260 times as luminous as the Sun.

QZ Carinae B1 (or Ac1) is a hot blue giant that is expanding and cooling away from the main sequence. It is of spectral type O8III with around 25 times the Sun's mass and 14 times its radius. With a surface temperature of 33,961 K, it is around 200,000 times as luminous as the Sun. Partner B2 (or Ac2) is a hot main sequence star of spectral type O9V with around 33 times the Sun's mass and 8 times its radius. With a surface temperature of 32,882 K, it is around 50,000 times as luminous as the Sun. Star B1 is less massive than B2 and is assumed to have undergone significant mass loss or mass transfer to B2. Together, all four stars have a combined mass 137 times that of the Sun.

The properties of the fainter component stars are difficult to determine, with orbits not well known, and even colours or spectral types difficult to determine for faint stars very close to the bright central pairings. Component Ad appears to be an A-type main sequence star with an effective temperature of 8,896 K, about twice the mass of the Sun, and 18 times as luminous. Component Ab is the most massive star outside the central four, around 10 to 12 M_{☉}, but its other physical properties can only be guessed. The properties of component E are even more uncertain, but the most likely model is a 2.5 M_{☉} 10,000 K star. An alternative model, a 0.5 M_{☉} 3,660 K pre-main sequence star is considered less likely as it conflicts with the expected ages of the other stars in the system.

== Variability ==
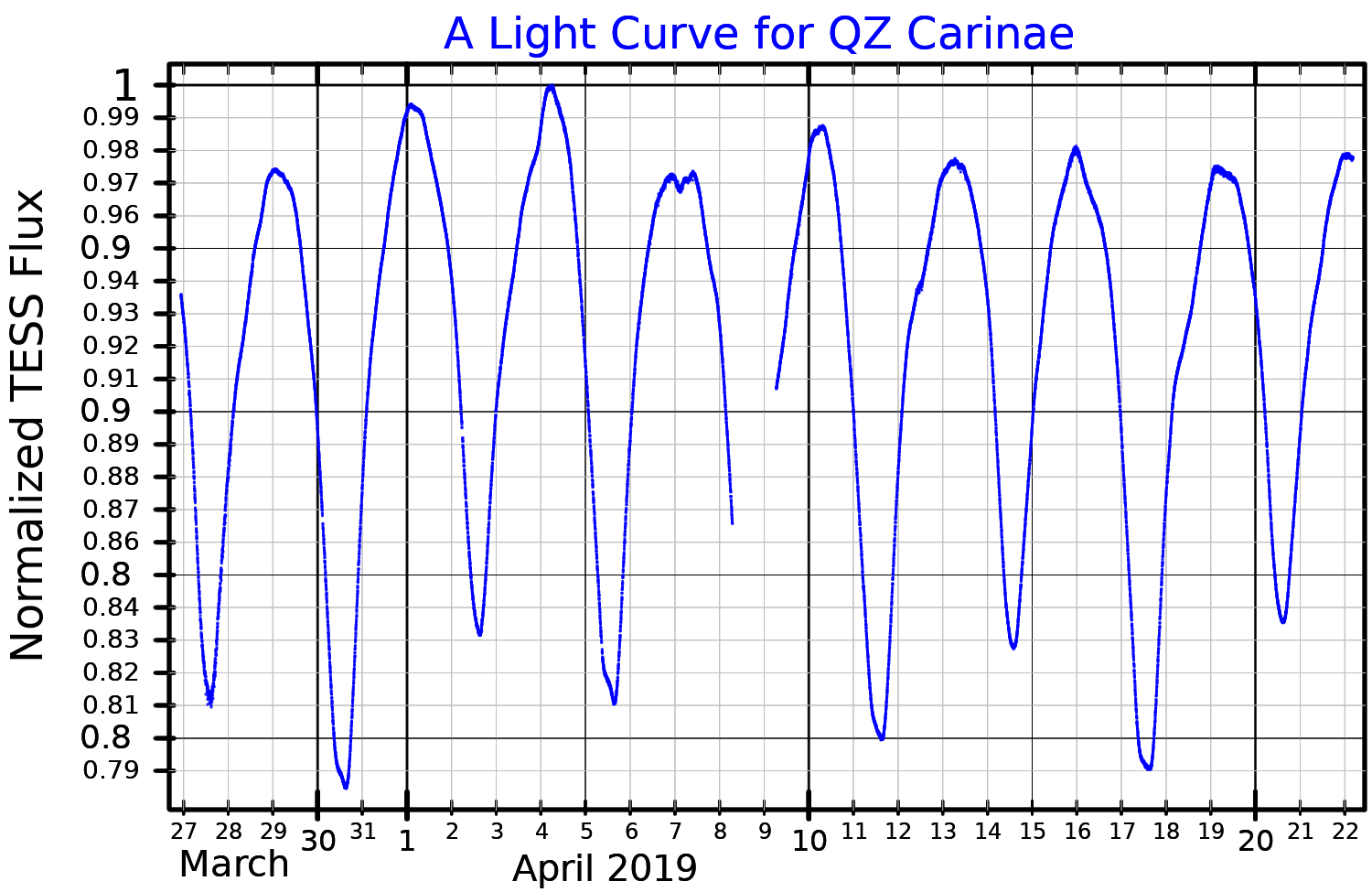
A light curve for QZ Carinae, plotted from TESS data

Star B (or Ac) is a Beta Lyrae variable eclipsing system. It causes the apparent magnitude of the system to vary regularly every 5.999 days from +6.16 at maximum to +6.49 at the primary minimum and +6.43 at the secondary minimum. It was first noted to be variable in 1972 by observers in Auckland.
