= NGC 2070 =

Open cluster in the constellation Dorado

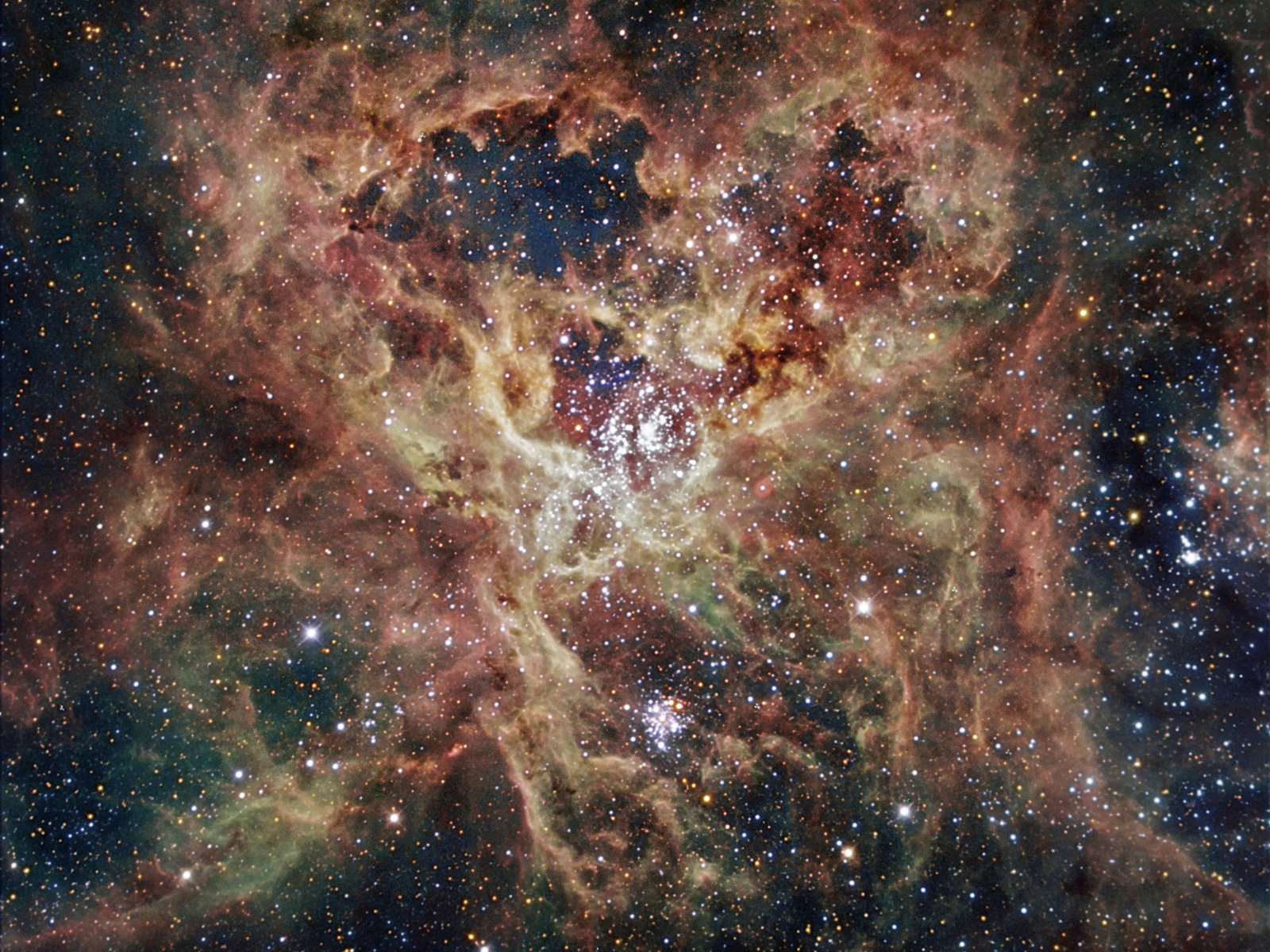
- NGC 2070 (ESO); Credit: ESO/IDA/Danish 1.5 m/R. Gendler, C. C. Thöne, C. Féron, and J.-E. Ovaldsen

Observation data (J2000 epoch)
- Right ascension: 05^{h} 38^{m} 42^{s}
- Declination: −69° 06′ 00″
- Distance: 157 kly (48.5 kpc)
- Apparent magnitude (V): 7.25
- Apparent dimensions (V): 3.50′ × 3.50′

Physical characteristics
- Other designations: Caldwell 103, PKS 0539-69

Associations
- Constellation: Dorado

NGC 2070 (also known as Caldwell 103) is a large open cluster and candidate super star cluster forming the heart of the bright region in the centre-south-east of the Large Magellanic Cloud. This cluster was discovered by French astronomer Nicolas-Louis de Lacaille in 1752. It is at the centre of the Tarantula Nebula and produces most of the energy that makes the latter's gas and dust visible. Its central condensation is the star cluster R136, one of the most energetic star clusters known. Among its stars are many of great dimension, including one of the most massive stars known (if not the most massive), R136a1, at roughly 300 M_{☉} and over 7 million L_{☉}.

Sky map position of NGC 2070 (green square)
