= Tarantula Nebula =

H II region in the constellation Dorado

Emission nebula
- H II region
- James Webb Space Telescope's NIRCam view of the Tarantula Nebula

Observation data: J2000 epoch
- Right ascension: 05^{h} 38^{m} 38^{s}
- Declination: −69° 05.7′
- Distance: 160 ± 10 k ly (49 ± 3 k pc)
- Apparent magnitude (V): +8
- Apparent dimensions (V): 40′ × 25′
- Constellation: Dorado

Physical characteristics
- Radius: 931 ly
- Notable features: In LMC
- Designations: NGC 2070, Doradus Nebula, Dor Nebula, 30 Doradus

The Tarantula Nebula (also known as 30 Doradus) is a large H II region in the Large Magellanic Cloud (LMC), forming its south-east corner (from Earth's perspective). The nebula is named for the arrangement of its bright, glowing gas filaments and dusty tendrils which stretch outward and look like the legs of a tarantula.

== Discovery ==
The Tarantula Nebula was observed by Nicolas-Louis de Lacaille during an expedition to the Cape of Good Hope between 1751 and 1753. He cataloged it as the second of the "Nebulae of the First Class", "Nebulosities not accompanied by any star visible in the telescope of two feet". It was described as a diffuse nebula 20' across.

Johann Bode included the Tarantula in his 1801 Uranographia star atlas and listed it in the accompanying Allgemeine Beschreibung und Nachweisung der Gestirne catalog as number 30 in the constellation "Xiphias or Dorado". Instead of being given a stellar magnitude, it was noted to be nebulous.

The name Tarantula Nebula arose in the mid-20th century from its appearance in deep photographic exposures.

30 Doradus has often been treated as the designation of a star, or of the central star cluster NGC 2070, but is now generally treated as referring to the whole nebula area of the Tarantula Nebula.

== Properties ==
The Tarantula Nebula has an apparent magnitude of 8. Considering its distance of about 49 kpc (160,000 light-years), this is a highly luminous non-stellar object. Its luminosity is so great that if it were as close to Earth as the Orion Nebula, the Tarantula Nebula would cast visible shadows. In fact, it is the most active starburst region known in the Local Group of galaxies.

It is also one of the largest H II regions in the Local Group with an estimated diameter around 200 to 570 pc (650 to 1860 light years), and also because of its enormous size, it is sometimes described as the largest. However, other H II regions, such as NGC 604, which is in the Triangulum Galaxy, could be larger. The nebula resides on the leading edge of the LMC, where ram pressure stripping, and the compression of the interstellar medium likely resulting from this, is at a maximum.

== NGC 2070 ==
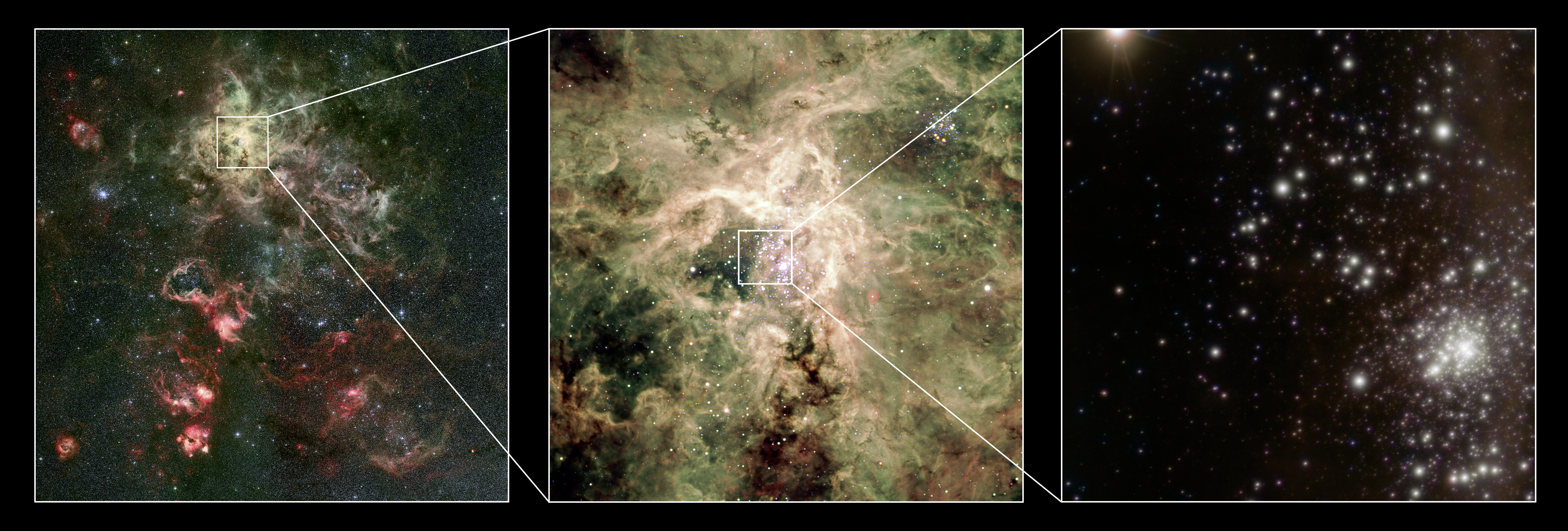
Detail of RMC 136a in cluster NGC 2070

30 Doradus has at its centre the star cluster NGC 2070 which includes the compact concentration of stars known as R136 that produces most of the energy that makes the nebula visible. The estimated mass of the cluster is 450,000 solar masses, suggesting it will likely become a globular cluster in the future. In addition to NGC 2070, the Tarantula Nebula contains several other star clusters including the much older Hodge 301. The most massive stars of Hodge 301 have already exploded in supernovae.

== Supernova 1987A ==
The closest supernova observed since the invention of the telescope, Supernova 1987A, occurred in the outskirts of the Tarantula Nebula. There is a prominent supernova remnant enclosing the open cluster NGC 2060. Still, the remnants of many other supernovae are difficult to detect in the complex nebulosity.

== Black hole VFTS 243 ==
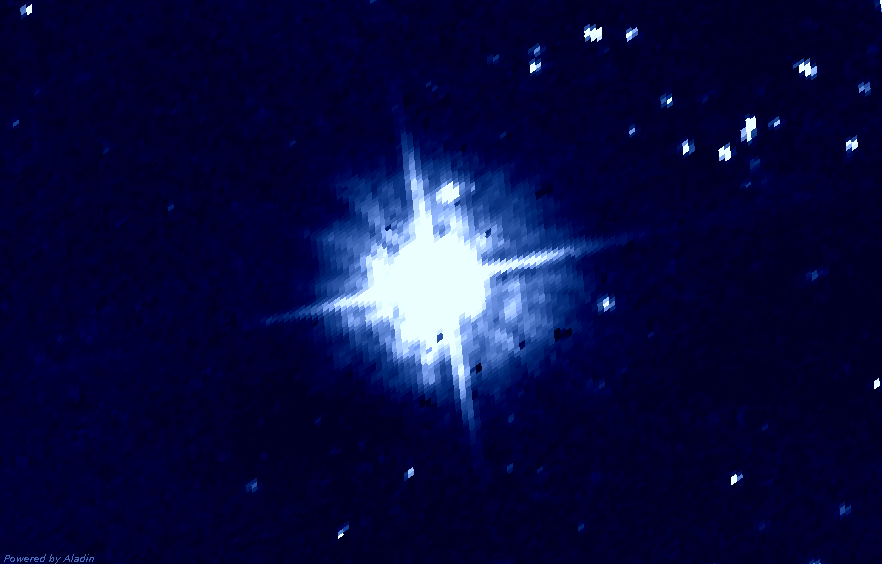
VFTS 243

An x-ray quiet black hole was discovered in the Tarantula Nebula, the first outside of the Milky Way Galaxy that does not radiate strongly. The black hole has a mass of at least nine solar masses and is in a circular orbit with its 25 solar mass blue giant companion VFTS 243.

== Video ==
Video about the stars in the Tarantula Nebula
