= List of O-type stars =

Relative size of O-type stars with other main-sequence stars

An O-type star is a hot, blue star of spectral type O in the Yerkes classification system employed by astronomers. They have surface temperatures in excess of 30,000 kelvins (K). Stars of this type have strong absorption lines of ionised helium, strong lines of other ionised elements, and hydrogen and neutral helium lines weaker than spectral type B.

This is a list of O-type stars by their distance from Earth.

== List ==
=== Milky Way galaxy ===
| Star system | Star Image | Median distance (ly) | Stars in system | Spectral type | Apparent magnitude (V) | Comments and references |
|---|---|---|---|---|---|---|
| Zeta Ophiuchi | | 440 ± 40 | 1 | O9.5 V | 2.56 – 2.58 | The closest O-type star to Earth. |
| Phi Persei B | | 720 ± 30 | 1 | sdO | 4.06 | Has a B-type companion star. |
| 28 Cygni B | | 840 ± 20 | 2 | sdO | 4.93 | Has a B-type companion star. |
| Iota Arae B | | 920 ± 20 | 2 | sdO | 5.18–5.26 | Has a B-type companion star. |
| Rho¹ Arae B | | 990 ± 10 | 2 | sdO | 6.275 | Has a B-type companion star. |
| Kappa¹ Apodis B | | 1,060 ± 20 | 1 | sdO | 5.52 | Has a B-type companion star. |
| Zeta Puppis (Naos) | | 1,080 ± 40 | 1 | O4If(n)p | 2.24 - 2.26 | |
| Gamma² Velorum B (Regor) | | 1096+26 −23 | 2 | O7.5III | 1.83 | Has a Wolf-Rayet companion star. |
| Theta² Orionis A | | 1,100 ± 80 | 3 | O9.5IVp | 5.02 | |
| Mintaka Aa1 (Delta Orionis) | | 1,200 | 3 | O9.5II | 2.5 | |
| V2119 Cygni | | 1203±22.3 | 1 | sdO | | |
| 60 Cygni | | 1225±57 | 1 | sdO | | |
| Upsilon Orionis | | 1,260±75 | 1 | B0V or O9.7V | +4.618±0.013 | |
| Alnitak Aa (Zeta Orionis) | | 1,260 ± 180 | 3 | O9.5Iab | 1.77 | |
| Sigma Orionis Aa | | 1263±4.3 | 2 | O9.5V | 4.07 | |
| Meissa A (Lambda Orionis) | | 1260±200 | 1 | O8 III((f)) | 3.7 | |
| AE Aurigae | | 1,320 ± 40 | 1 | O9.5V | 5.96 | |
| Xi Persei (Menkib) | | 1,340±65 | 1 | O7.5III(n)((f)) | 4.04 | |
| Theta¹ Orionis C1 | | 1340±65 | 1 | O6Vp | 5.13 | |
| Iota Orionis Aa1 (Haytsa) | | 1343+45.6 −42.3 | 3 | O9 III | 2.77 | |
| LS Muscae | | 1383±43 | 1 | sdO | | |
| W40 IRS 1A South | | 1,420 | 1 | O9.5 | 15 | Member of Westerhout 40. |
| IN Comae Berenices B (HD 112313) | | 1,650 ± 40 | 2 | sdO | 8.69 | Central star of LoTr 5 Planetary Nebula. Has a G-type companion star. |
| HD 49798 | | 1,700 ± 46 | 1 | sdO6p | | |
| 10 Lacertae | | 1,800±103 | 1 | O9V | 4.880 | |
| FY Canis Majoris B | | 1,820 ± 70 | 2 | sdO | 4.8 - 6.25 | Has a B-type companion star. |
| Mu Columbae | | 1,894±111 | 1 | O9.5 V | 5.18 | |
| HD 186924 | | 2000 | 1 | O6fp | | It is the central star of NGC 6826 Planetary Nebula. |
| HD 206267 | | 2,000 | 2 | O6V((f)) + O9V | 5.70 | |
| UY Sextantis | | 2,200 ± 100 | 1 | sdO9VII:He6 | 13.49 | |
| 68 Cygni | | 2,200 ± 200 | 1 | O7.5IIIn((f)) | 5.00 | |
| Delta Circini | | 2,300 ± 200 | 1 | O8IV + O9.5V | 5.09 | |
| S Monocerotis (15 Monocerotis) | | 2,300 ± 200 | 3 | O7V((f))zvar + O9.5Vn | | |
| HD 73882 | | 2,400 ± 100 | 1 | O8.5IV | 7.19 - 7.29 | |
| 1 Camelopardalis A | | 2,580 ± 100 | 1 | O9.7IIn | 5.77 | |
| X Persei | | 2,600 ± 100 | 1 | O9.5IIIe-B0Ve | 6.778 | |
| NSVS 14256825 A | | 2,700 ± 100 | 2 | sdOB | 13.2 | Has a M-type companion star. |
| Lambda Cephei | | 3,098.5 | 1 | O6.5If(n)p | +5.050 | |
| HD 193322 | | 3,100 | 2 | O9Vnn + O8.5 III | +5.958 | |
| Mu Normae | | 3,260 | 1 | O9.7Iab | 4.91 | |
| HD 35914 | | 3,600 ± 1.0 | 1 | O7fp | | It is the central star of IC 418 Planetary Nebula. |
| 63 Ophiuchi | | 3,600 ± 300 | 1 | O8II((f)) | 6.20 | |
| UW Canis Majoris | | 3,800 | 2 | O7.5-8Iabf + O9.7Ib | 4.95 | |
| Trumpler 27-27 | | 3,900 | 1 | O8III((f)) | | |
| V3903 Sagittarii A (11 Sagittarii) | | 3,900 ± 100 | 1 | O7V(n)z | 7.00–7.45 | Has a B-type companion. |
| HD 148937 | | 3,900 ± 100 | 1 | O6f?p | 6.73 | |
| 19 Cephei | | 3,913.88 | 1 | O9Ib | 5.08 | |
| HD 54879 | | 4100 ± 200 | 1 | O9.7V | 7.65 | |
| HD 164492 A | | 4100 ± 200 | 1 | O7.5III | | Part of Trifid Nebula |
| 9 Sagittarii | | 4,100 ± 400 | 1 | O4V((f))z (O3.5V((f+)) + O5–5.5V((f))) | 5.97 | |
| 15 Sagittarii | | 4,200±650 | 1 | O9.7 Iab or B0 Iab | 5.37 | |
| AO Cassiopeiae (Pearce's Star) | | 4,300 ± 300 | 2 | O8V((f)) + O9.2II | 6.07-6.24 | |
| HD 149404 (V918 Scorpii) | | 4,300 ± 400 | 2 | O7.5I(f) + ON9.7I | 5.42 - 5.50 | |
| HD 150136 | | 4,310 ± 390 | 3 | O3 V((f*)) - O3.5 V((f+)) + O5.5-6 V((f)) + O6.5-7 V((f)) | 5.54 | |
| 16 Sagittarii | | 4,600 | 1 | O9.5 III | 6.02 | |
| BE Ursae Majoris A | | 4,600 ± 200 | 2 | DO | 14.8 to 17.8 | Has a M-type companion star. |
| Y Cygni | | 4,900 | 2 | O9.5V + O9.5V | 7.3 - 7.9 | |
| WR 140 B (SBC9 1232) | | 4950 ± 21 | 2 | O5.5fc | 6.85 | Has a Wolf-Rayet Companion. |
| HD 92206 | | 5,000 | 3 | O8V + O9.7V | 8.966 | Has a B-type companion. |
| HD 229196 | | 5,000 | 1 | O5 | | |
| HD 93521 B | | 5,000 ± 300 | 1 | O9.5IIInn or O9.5Vp | 7.03 | |
| Tau Canis Majoris Aa | | 5,120.66 | 3 | O9II | 4.40 | |
| HD 46223 | | 5,200 | 1 | O4V | | |
| HD 46150 | | 5,200 | 1 | O5V | | |
| 4U 1700-37 (V884 Scorpii) | | 5,200 ± 200 | 1 | O6Iafcp | 6.51 | |
| Plaskett's Star (V640 Monocerotis) | | 5,245 | 2 | O8I + O7.5III | 6.06 | |
| Cygnus OB2-8A | | 5,400 ± 200 | 1 | O6If + O5.5III(f) | 9.06 | |
| BD+43 3654 | | 5,400 ± 300 | 1 | O4If | 10.06 | |
| HD 15558 (HIP 11832) | | 5,700 | 1 | O4.5III(f) (O5.5III(f) + O7V) | 7.87 | |
| HD 168076 | | 5,700±400 | 2 | O3.5V + O7.5V | +8.24 | |
| NGC 7662 Central star | | 5,730 ± 340 | 1 | sdO | | Central star of NGC 7662 Planetary Nebula. |
| RY Scuti | | 5,870 | 2 | O7 + O9.7 Ibpe | 9.12 – 9.72 | |
| Prisms 24-17 | | 5,900 | 1 | O3.5III | | |
| HD 48099 | | 5,965 | 2 | O5.5V((f)) + O9V | 6.37 | |
| HD 165319 | | 6,000 | 1 | O9.7Ib | | Central star of Sh2-46 Nebula. |
| Alpha Camelopardalis | | 6,000 | 1 | O9Ia | 4.29 | |
| WR 133 B (V1676 Cyg) | | 6,100 ± 300 | 2 | O9I | 6.75 - 6.84 | Has a Wolf-Rayet Companion. |
| HD 191612 A | | 6,100 ± 300 | 1 | O8fp | 7.84 – 7.91 | |
| HD 108 | | 6,230 ± 360 | 1 | O4–8f?p | 7.40 | |
| HD 59088 | | 6,500 | 1 | O(H)6f | | It is the central star of NGC 2392 Planetary Nebula. |
| WR 25 (HD 93162) | | 6,500 | 2 | O2.5If*/WN6 + OB | 8.80 | |
| Pismis 24-1 (HD 319718) | | 6,500 | 2 | O3.5If*+O4III(f+) | | |
| WR 137 B | | 6,700 ± 200 | 1 | O9V | 7.91 | Has a Wolf-Rayet Companion. |
| CV Serpentis B | | 6,700 ± 200 | 2 | O8-9IV | 9.08 | Has a Wolf-Rayet Companion. |
| LY Aurigae | | 6,800 | 3 | O9II + O9III | 6.85 (6.66 - 7.35) | Has B-type companion. |
| HD 151804 (V973 Scorpii) | | 7,000 | 1 | O8 Iaf | 5.22 - 5.28 | |
| HD 138403 | | 7175.44 | 1 | O8(f)ep | | It is the central star of Hen 2-131 Planetary Nebula. |
| Cygnus X-1 (HDE 226868) | | 7,300 ± 200 | 2 | O9.7Iab | 8.95 | Has a Black Hole Companion. |
| Theta Muscae | | 7,400 | 4 | O6/7V + O9.5/B0Iab+O9III | 5.53 | Has a Wolf-Rayet Companion. |
| HD 92206 B | | 7,400 ± 300 | 1 | O6.5V or O6V((f))z | | |
| PSR B1259−63/LS 2883 A | | 7,500 | 2 | O9.5Ve | 10.34 | Has a Pulsar Companion. |
| Eta Carinae A (Eta Argus) | | 7,500 | 2 | O | −1.0 to ~7.6 | part of Trumpler 16 in the Carina Nebula. |
| HD 93129 | | 7,500 | 2 | O2If* (O2If+O3.5V) + O3.5 V((f))z | 6.90 | Part of Trumpler 14. |
| QZ Carinae (HD 93206) | | 7,501.6 | 4 | O9.7I+O8III+O9V | 6.24 | |
| HD 93205 (V560 Carinae) | | 7,600 ± 400 | 2 | O3.5Vf + O8V | 7.75 | |
| HD 97319 | | 7,800-9,800 | 1 | O | | Part of NGC 3576. |
| HD 93250 | | 7,900 ± 400 | 1 | O4 IV(fc) | 7.41 | |
| 6 Cassiopeiae B | | 8,000 | 2 | O9.75 | 5.34 - 5.45 | Has a A-type Hypergiant Companion. |
| HD 93160 | | 8,000 | 1 | O6III | | |
| LS 5039 A | | 8200±300 | 1 | O(f)N6.5V | 11.27 | Has a Black Hole Companion. |
| WR 22 B | | 8,300 ± 700 | 2 | O9III-V | 6.42 | Has a Wolf-Rayet Companion. |
| HD 92206 | | 8,400 ± 500 | 2 | O6.5V + O6.5V, O6V((f))z (combined) | +8.219 | |
| Abell 63 Central star | | 8,810 | 1 | sdO | | Center Star of Abell 63 Planetary Nebula. |
| HD 303308 | | 9,200 | 1 | O3V | | |
| LSS 4067 (CD−38°11748) | | 9,500–12,700 | 1 | O4.5Ifpe | 11.44 | |
| DH Cephei | | 9,600 ± 400 | 2 | O5.5 V + O6 V | 8.61 | |
| BD+60°2522 | | 9,800 ± 400 | 1 | O6.5(f)(n)p | 8.67 | |
| HD 93130 | | 10,000 | 1 | O7II(f) | | |
| HD 93403 | | 10,000 | 1 | O5.5III(fc)var | 7.272 | |
| HD 93632 | | 10,000 | 1 | O5III(f) | | |
| LSS 4067 | | 11,000 | 1 | O4.5Ifpe | | Part of HM 1. |
| HM 1-6 | | 11,000 | 1 | O5If | | Part of HM 1. |
| HM 1-8 | | 11,000 | 2 | O4.5IV(f) + O9.7V | | Part of HM 1. |
| HD 35619 | | 12,000 | 1 | O7.5V((f))z | 8.572 | |
| WR 9 B | | 12,000 ± 600 | 2 | O7 | 10.50 | Has a Wolf-Rayet Companion star. |
| MY Camelopardalis | | 13,050 | 1 | O6nn (O6V((f)) + O6V((f))) | 9.80 - 10.15 | |
| WR 21a | | 13,100 ± 700 | 1 | O3/WN5ha + O3Vz((f*)) | 12.661 | Has a Wolf-Rayet Companion. |
| CD Crucis B (WR 47) | | 14,000 | 2 | O5V | 10.81 | Has a Wolf-Rayet Companion. |
| WR 20a | | 14,000 ± 1,000 | 2 | O3If*/WN6 + O3If*/WN6 | 13.28 | |
| HD 64568 | | 15,000 ± 1,000 | 1 | O3V((f*))z | 9.39 | |
| TU Muscae | | 15500 | 2 | O7V + O8V | 8.307 | |
| NGC 1624-2 | | 16,800 | 1 | O7f?cp | 11.57 | |
| GCIRS 16SW | | 20,000 | 1 | Ofpe/WN9 | | |
| GCIRS 8* | | 20,000 | 1 | O5 | | |
| V1936 Aquilae | | 20,000 | 1 | O4I | 15.1 | |
| Westerhout 51d | | 20,000 | 1 | O | | Member of Westerhout 51. |
| Westerhout 51-3 | | 20,000 | 1 | O3-8V | | Member of Westerhout 51. |
| Westerhout 51-57 | | 20,000 | 1 | O4V | | Member of Westerhout 51. |
| MSP 183 | | 20,000 | 1 | O3V(f) | | Part of Westerlund 2. |
| HD 116852 (HIP 65890) | | 20,580 | 1 | O8.5 II-III ((f)) | 8.47 | |
| WR 30a B | | 21,920+1,400 −1,090 | 2 | O5((f)) | 12.73 | Has a Wolf-Rayet Companion. |
| Centaurus X-3 (Krzemiński's star) | | 24,000 ± 2,000 | 2 | O6-7 II-III + ? | 13.25 (- 13.39) - 13.46 | |
| HD 15558 A | | 24,400 | 1 | O5.5III(f) | | Part of IC 1805. |
| MTT 68 | | 24,787.88 | 1 | O2If* | 14.72 | |
| HD 97950 A3 | | 24,800 | 1 | O3III | | |
| WR 42e (2MASS J11144550-115001) | | 25,000 | 1 | O3If*/WN6 | 14.53 | |
| HD 97950 | | 25,000 | 1 | O | | |
| Arches-F15 | | 25,000 | 1 | O6-7 Ia+ | | |
| Arches-F18 | | 25,000 | 1 | O4-5 Ia+ | | |
| WR 102ka (Peony star) | | 26,000 | 2 | Ofpe/WN9 | | |
| WR 148 B | | 27,000 | 2 | O5V? | 10.3 | Has a Wolf-Rayet Companion. |
| Westerhout 49-2 | | 36,200 | 1 | O2-3.5If* | | |
| Westerhout 49-3 | | 36,200 | 1 | O3-O7V | | |
| Mercer 30-1 A | | 40,000 | 1 | O6-7.5lf+ | | |
| US 708 | | 60,300 ± 8,500 | 1 | sdOHe | 18.8 | |

=== Magellanic Clouds ===
The Large Magellanic Cloud (LMC) is around 163 kly distant and the Small Magellanic Cloud (SMC) is around 204 kly distant

| Host galaxy | Star system | Median distance (ly) | Stars in system | Spectral type | Apparent magnitude (V) | Comments and references |
|---|---|---|---|---|---|---|
| LMC | R126a4 | 157,000 | 1 | O3V((f*))(n) | | |
| LMC | R136a5 | 157,000 | 1 | O2l(n)f* | | |
| LMC | R136a6 | 157,000 | 1 | O2I(n)f*p | | |
| LMC | R136a8 | 157,000 | 1 | O2-3V | | |
| LMC | LH 10-3209 A | 160,000 | 1 | O3III(f*) | | Part of NGC 1763. |
| LMC | Melenick 39 A | 160,000 | 1 | O2.5If/WN6 | | |
| LMC | Sk -65° 47 | 160,000 | 1 | O4If | | |
| LMC | Sk -68° 137 | 160,000 | 1 | OB | | |
| LMC | Sk -69° 212 | 160,000 | 1 | O6lf | | |
| LMC | Sk -69° 249 A | 160,000 | 2 | O7lf | | |
| LMC | ST5-31 | 160,000 | 1 | O2-3(n)fp | | |
| LMC | TIC 276934932 | 160,000 | 2 | O3If + O6V | | |
| LMC | R136a7 | 163,000 | 1 | O3III(f*) | | |
| LMC | MACHO 80.7443.1718 B | 163,000 | 2 | O9.5 V | 13.628 | Has a B-type companion. |
| LMC | R136b | 163,000 | 1 | O4If | 13.24 | |
| LMC | LH 54-425 | 163,000 | 2 | O3V + O5V | 13.13 | |
| LMC | HD 269810 | 163,000 | 1 | O2III(f*) | 12.22 | |
| LMC | HSH95-36 | 163,000 | 1 | O2lf* | | |
| LMC | Melnick 42 | 163,000 | 1 | O2If* | 12.78 | Part of Tarantula Nebula. |
| LMC | LMC P3 | 163,000 | 2 | O5III(f) | | Has a Neutron Star companion. |
| LMC | MACHO*05:34:41.3−69:31:39 | 163,000 | 2 | O3If* + O6V | | |
| LMC | BI 253 | 164,000 | 1 | O2V-III(n)((f*)) | 13.76 | |
| LMC | VFTS 243 (2MASS J05380840-6909190) | 164,000 | 1 | O7V(n)((f)) | 15.26 | Has a Known Black Hole Companion |
| LMC | VFTS 102 | 164,000 | 1 | O9:Vnnne | 15.806 | |
| LMC | VFTS 352 | 164,000 | 2 | O4.5 V(n)((fc)):z: + O5.5 V(n)((fc)):z: | 14.38 | |
| LMC | VFTS 506 | 164,000 | 1 | ON2V((n))((f*)) | | |
| LMC | VFTS 621 | 164,000 | 1 | O2V((f*))z | | |
| LMC | VFTS 1021 | 164,000 | 1 | O4 lf+ | | |
| LMC | VFTS 16 | 170,000 | 1 | O2IIIf* | | |
| LMC | LMC X-1 A | 180,000 | 2 | O8 IIIf or O8 f?p | 14.612 ± 0.171 | Has a Black hole Companion. |
| SMC | SMC AB7 | 197,000 | 2 | O6I(f) | 13.016 | |
| SMC | SMC AB8 | 197,000 | 2 | O4V | 12.83 | |
| SMC | HD 5980 C | 200,000 | 3 | OI | 8.8 - 11.9 | Has a LBV and Wolf-Rayet Companion |
| SMC | HD 346-W1 | 200,000 | 1 | O5.5lf | | |
| SMC | HD 346-W3 | 200,000 | 1 | O3V | | |

=== Andromeda Galaxy and Triangulum Galaxy ===
The Andromeda Galaxy (M31) is 2.5 Mly distant and the Triangulum Galaxy is around 3.2 Mly distant

| Host galaxy | Star system | Median distance (ly) | Stars in system | Spectral type | Apparent magnitude (V) | Comments and references |
|---|---|---|---|---|---|---|
| Andromeda | LGGS J004246.86+413336.4 | 2,500,000 | 1 | O3-O5If | | |
| Triangulum | [BMS2003] 867 | 2,700,000 | 2 | O4Iab+O4Ia | | |
| Triangulum | M33 X-7 A | 2,700, 000±70000 | 2 | O7-8III | +18.70 | Has a Black Hole Companion |
| Triangulum | M33-013406.63 (B416/UIT301) | 3,000,000 | 1 | O9.5Ia | | |

=== Other galaxies ===
| Host galaxy | Star system | Median distance (ly) | Stars in system | Spectral type | Apparent magnitude (V) | Comments and references |
|---|---|---|---|---|---|---|
| IC 3418 | SDSS J1229+1122 | 55,000,000 | 1 | O | 22.85 | |

== See also ==
- List of Wolf–Rayet stars
- List of luminous blue variable stars
- List of nearest stars by spectral type
