= Hen 2-131 =

Planetary nebula in the constellation Apus

Emission nebula
- Planetary nebula
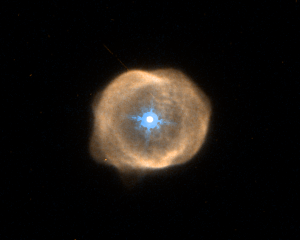

Observation data: J2000 epoch
- Right ascension: 15^{h} 37^{m} 11.2^{s}
- Declination: −71° 54′ 52.9″
- Distance: 2200 pc
- Apparent magnitude (V): 10.47
- Constellation: Apus

Physical characteristics
- Absolute magnitude (V): -
- Notable features: -

Hen 2-131 is a planetary nebula in the southern constellation of Apus. It was discovered by Andrew David Thackeray in 1950 and added to the Catalogues of Hα-emission Stars and Nebulae in the Magellanic Clouds by Karl Gordon Henize in 1967.

Hen 2-131 is about 2,200 pc from earth. HD 138403 is the star located in the center of Hen 2–131 with a spectral type of O8(f)ep. The nebula expands at a speed of 11.5 km/s, and the temperature of HD 138403 is about 34,000 K. HD 138403 is suspected of variability, possibly by 0.1 to 0.15 magnitudes over a period of several hours. This nebula is similar to IC 418, IC 4593 and Hen 2-138.
