= LMC P3 =

Gamma-ray Binary in the Large Magellanic Cloud

- Image of Gamma ray Binary LMC P3 (Circled) within Supernova Remnant DEM L241

Observation data Epoch J2000 Equinox J2000
- Constellation: Dorado
- Right ascension: 05^{h} 35^{m} 0^{s}
- Declination: −67° 35′ 11″

Characteristics
- Evolutionary stage: Main-sequence + Neutron Star
- Spectral type: O5III(f)

Astrometry
Radial velocity (R_{v})	13.5 km/s
Distance	163,000 ly (50,589 pc)

Orbit
Primary	main-sequence star
Secondary	compact object
Period (P)	10.301 days
Semi-major axis (a)	0.3 au
Eccentricity (e)	0.4 ± 0.07
Inclination (i)	69.8° ± 0.84°
Semi-amplitude (K_{2}) (secondary)	10.69 ± 1.23 km/s

Details

A
Mass	33.5 M_{☉}
Radius	14.5 R_{☉}
Temperature	33,000 K

B
Mass	1.4 M_{☉}

Other designations
- LMC P3, 4FGL J0535.2-6736, CXOU J053600.0-673507

Database references
SIMBAD	data

LMC P3 (also known as 4FGL J0535.2-6736) is a gamma-ray binary star system located in the Large Magellanic Cloud (LMC), a satellite galaxy of the Milky Way Galaxy approximately 163,000 light-years from Earth. It is the first gamma-ray binary discovered outside the Milky Way and the most luminous such system known, with gamma-ray emissions exceeding 10³⁶ ergs per second in the high-energy (HE) range above 100 MeV. The system consists of a massive O-type star orbiting a compact object, likely a neutron star, in an eccentric 10.3-day orbit, producing periodic high-energy emissions through interactions between the stellar wind and relativistic particles from the compact object. LMC P3 resides within the supernova remnant DEM L241 and serves as a key object for studying particle acceleration and binary evolution in low-metallicity environments.

== Discovery ==
LMC P3 was initially identified as a high-mass X-ray binary (HMXB) in 2012 through observations with NASA's Chandra X-ray Observatory, located within the supernova remnant DEM L241 in the LMC. In 2015, analysis of data from NASA's Fermi Gamma-ray Space Telescope revealed a 10.301-day periodicity in gamma-ray emissions, confirming its classification as a gamma-ray binary—the first detected beyond the Milky Way. This discovery stemmed from a broader study of gamma-ray sources in the LMC, highlighting LMC P3 as an exceptionally powerful emitter. Follow-up observations across multiple wavelengths, including X-rays (via NASA's Neil Gehrels Swift Observatory and ESA's XMM-Newton), radio (Australia Telescope Compact Array), and optical (Southern Astrophysical Research Telescope), further characterized the system.

Very high-energy (VHE) gamma-ray emissions above 100 GeV were detected in 2017 using the High Energy Stereoscopic System (H.E.S.S.) telescope array in Namibia, marking LMC P3 as the first extragalactic VHE gamma-ray binary. These observations showed variability tied to the orbital phase, with VHE emissions occurring during approximately 20% of the orbit.

== Characteristics ==
The binary system comprises an O5 III blue supergiant star, with an estimated mass of 33.5 solar masses and a surface temperature over 33,000 °C (60,000 °F), orbiting a compact object that is likely a neutron star with a mass around 1.4 solar masses. The massive supergiant star expels a dense stellar wind at speeds of millions of miles per hour, while the compact object accelerates particles to relativistic speeds, possibly via a pulsar wind or jets.

The supernova remnant DEM L241 is believed to be the birthplace of the compact object, formed from the explosion of a massive progenitor star.

=== Emissions ===
Emissions from LMC P3 span radio, optical, X-ray, and gamma-ray wavelengths, modulated by the orbital cycle:

- Gamma-ray Emissions: Detected by Fermi at energies above 100 MeV and VHE emissions above 100 GeV, observed by H.E.S.S., occur near inferior conjunction (orbital phases 0.2–0.4) and are anti-correlated with HE emissions.
- X-ray Emissions: Variable X-ray flux observed by Chandra, Swift, and XMM-Newton, peaking at periastron when the compact object interacts with the stellar disk.

== See also ==
- List of O-type stars
