= VFTS 16 =

Massive star in the Large Magellanic Cloud

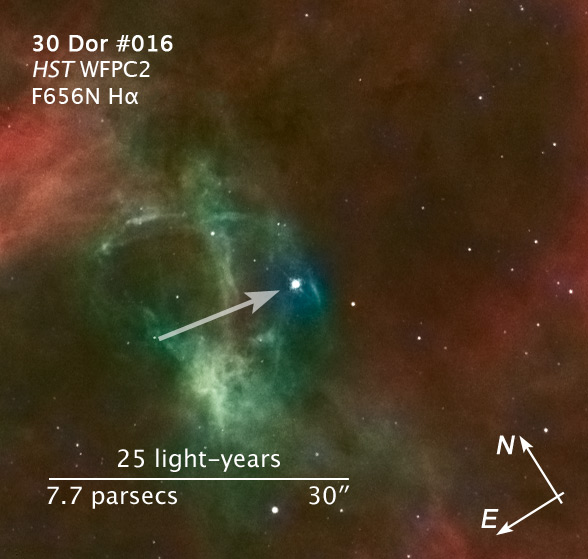
- Image of VFTS 16

Observation data Epoch J2000.0 Equinox ICRS
- Constellation: Dorado
- Right ascension: 05^{h} 37^{m} 8.87^{s}
- Declination: −69° 7′ 20.35″

Characteristics
- Evolutionary stage: Blue supergiant
- Spectral type: O2IIIf*

Astrometry
Radial velocity (R_{v})	190.3 km/s
Proper motion (μ)	RA: 1.313 mas/yr Dec.: 0.508 mas/yr
Distance	170,000 ly

Details
Mass	100 M_{☉}
Temperature	50,600 K
Age	0.7±0.1 Myr

Other designations
- VFTS 16, 30 Dor 016, TIC 277109100, 2MASS J05370888-6907203, Gaia DR3 4657690620070706432

Database references
SIMBAD	data

VFTS 16 (also known as 30 Dor 016), is a massive O-type star in the Tarantula Nebula (30 Doradus) within the Large Magellanic Cloud (LMC). Catalogued during the VLT-FLAMES Tarantula Survey (VFTS), it is one of the most massive known stars, with an estimated mass of approximately 100 solar masses (M⊙). Ejected early in its lifetime from the young, massive cluster R136 , VFTS 16 is a confirmed runaway star currently located roughly 120 parsecs (in projection) from its origin in a low-density region. Another massive O-type star, VFTS 72, is found to be a runaway star.

== Observation ==
VFTS 16 was cataloged during the VLT-FLAMES Tarantula Survey, which studied massive stars in the 30 Doradus region. Its runaway status was confirmed using Gaia DR2 astrometric data, which demonstrated significant proper motion consistent with ejection from R136.

== Characteristics ==
VFTS 16 is classified as an O2 III(f)* star. The (f*) designation indicates emission features in its spectrum, characteristic of hot, massive stars with strong stellar winds.

VFTS 16 was likely ejected via the dynamical ejection scenario (DES) involving interactions with other massive stars or binaries in R136.

== Significance ==
VFTS 16 is a critical case study for understanding the formation, evolution, and ejection mechanisms of very massive stars (>100 M⊙). Its high mass and runaway status provide constraints on stellar dynamics in dense clusters and the upper mass limit for stars. The star’s properties, including its weak nitrogen enrichment and lack of significant helium enrichment, suggest a relatively unevolved state despite its dynamical history.
