= HD 54879 =

Binary system in the constellation Canis Major

- Location of HD 54879 (circled)

Observation data Epoch J2000.0 Equinox J2000.0
- Constellation: Canis Major
- Right ascension: 07^{h} 10^{m} 08.14876^{s}
- Declination: −11° 48′ 09.8389″
- Apparent magnitude (V): 7.65

Characteristics
- Evolutionary stage: main sequence
- Spectral type: O9.7V
- U−B color index: −0.80
- B−V color index: −0.05
- J−H color index: −0.037
- J−K color index: −0.079

Astrometry
Radial velocity (R_{v})	34.46±0.27 km/s
Proper motion (μ)	RA: −2.808 mas/yr Dec.: 1.270 mas/yr
Parallax (π)	0.799±0.0347 mas
Distance	4,100 ± 200 ly (1,250 ± 50 pc)

Details
Mass	14±7 M_{☉}
Radius	6.1±1.5 R_{☉}
Luminosity	28,200+16,500 −10,400 L_{☉}
Surface gravity (log g)	4.0±0.1 cgs
Temperature	30,500±500 K
Rotation	2,562+63 −58 days
Age	5±1 Myr

Other designations
- BD−11°1822, Gaia DR2 3045391130111207808, HD 54879, HIP 34612, SAO 152491, PPM 218262, TIC 177860391, TYC 5402-632-1, GSC 05402-00632, 2MASS J07100815-1148097

Database references
SIMBAD	data

HD 54879 is a bluish-hued star in the southern constellation of Canis Major, close to the border with Monoceros. It is too faint to be seen by the naked eye, having an apparent magnitude of 7.65, but can be readily observed using a pair of binoculars. The star is located some 4,100 light-years (1,300 pc) distant according to Gaia EDR3 parallax measurements, and is moving away from the Solar System at a heliocentric radial velocity of 34.46 km/s.

== Stellar properties ==
This is an O-type main-sequence star with a stellar classification of O9.7V, indicating that it is near the border between the spectral types O and B. It radiates 28,200 times the luminosity of the Sun from its photosphere at an effective temperature of 30,500 K (30,200 °C; 54,400 °F), over five times hotter than the Sun. Its mass and radius are not well-constrained due to uncertainties in the star's distance, but simulations show that it likely formed with a mass of 16 ± 1 M_{☉} about 5 million years ago.

=== Magnetic field ===
The star was found to have a strong magnetic field in 2014 with an average strength of 2,954 G and a dipole strength of 3,939 G, thousands of times stronger than Earth's magnetic field (0.25–0.65 G). Its strength slowly varies with a period of 7.41 years. This is related to the extremely slow rotation of HD 54879 with a period of 7.02 years, the second longest recorded in an O-type star after HD 108.

Since the magnetic fields trap stellar winds to an Alfvén radius of ≳12 times the stellar radius, HD 54879 experiences very little mass loss, estimated at 6.3×10^{−11} M_{☉}/yr, compared to the ~1×10^{−9} M_{☉}/yr if the star did not possess a magnetic field. The entrapped gas forms a disk around the star in the equatorial plane of the magnetic field, which is probably the source of the Hα emissions seen in the star's spectra.

=== Element distribution ===
In 2021, a spectroscopic study proposed the possibility that the stellar atmosphere was inhomogeneous in elemental makeup, with helium lines forming at much higher altitudes than the emission lines of oxygen and silicon. This, however, was refuted in 2024, and a more uniform chemical composition is now favored.

=== 2019 controversy ===
In 2019, a research team announced that a sudden spike occurred in the strength of the magnetic field, the spectral type of the star shifted from O9.7V to B2V, and that the star displays radial velocity variations indicative of a long-period binary. These findings were later retracted, the apparent changes attributed to an inadequate signal-to-noise ratio related to instabilities in the data reduction pipelines. However, a follow-up study by another team was unable to confirm such instabilities and instead accredited the faulty results to human error.

== See also ==
- NGC 1624-2
- Tau Scorpii
