= Y Cygni =

Binary star in the constellation Cygnus

Y Cyg
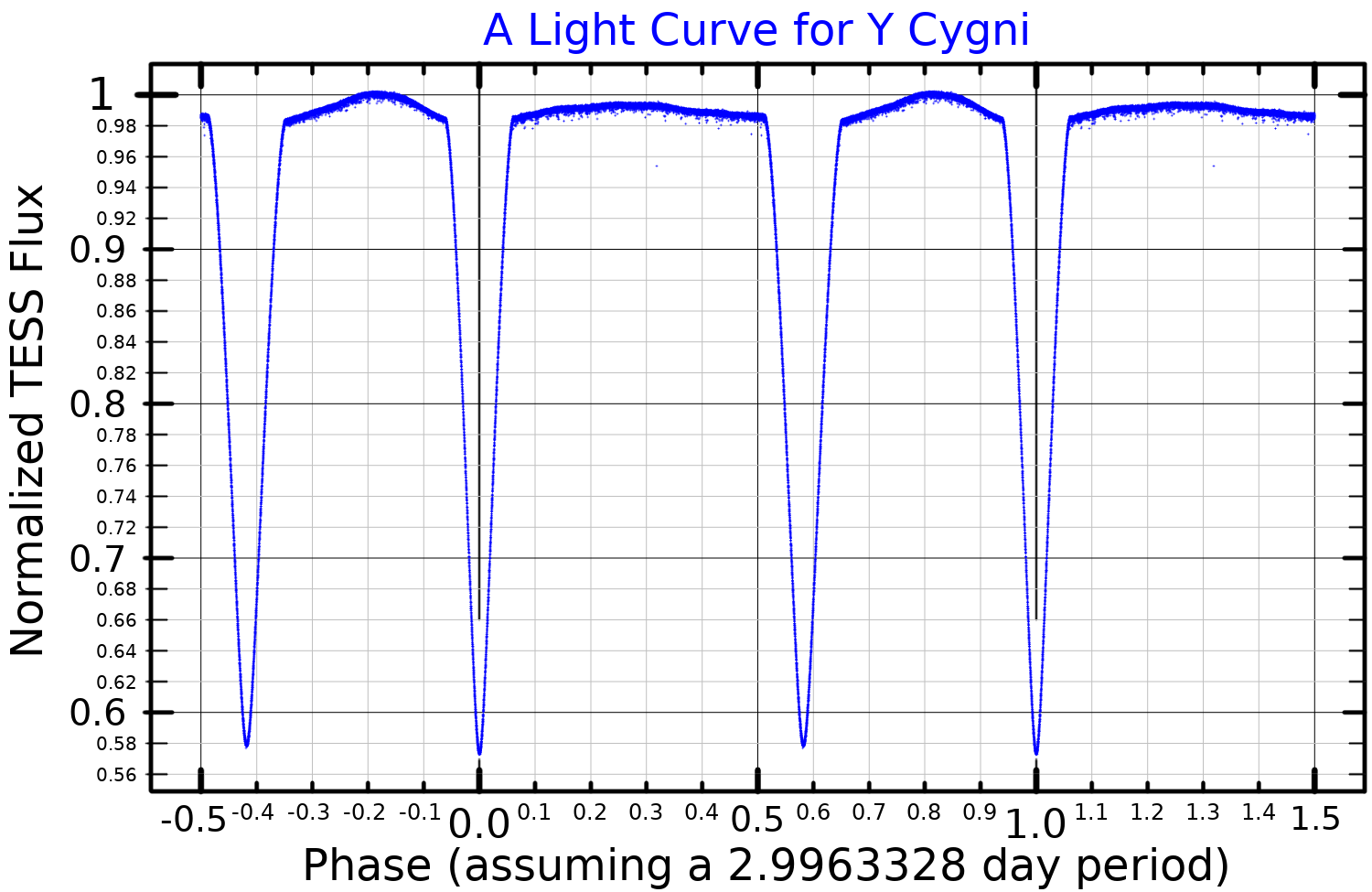
- A light curve for Y Cygni, plotted from TESS data

Observation data Epoch J2000 Equinox J2000
- Constellation: Cygnus
- Right ascension: 20^{h} 52^{m} 3.57718^{s}
- Declination: +34° 39′ 27.4861″
- Apparent magnitude (V): 7.3 - 7.9

Characteristics

Primary
- Spectral type: O9.5V
- Apparent magnitude (U): 5.91
- Apparent magnitude (B): 6.996
- Apparent magnitude (V): 7.287
- U−B color index: −1.086
- B−V color index: −0.291

Secondary
- Spectral type: O9.5V
- Apparent magnitude (U): 5.883
- Apparent magnitude (B): 6.974
- Apparent magnitude (V): 7.265
- U−B color index: −1.091
- B−V color index: −0.291
- Variable type: Algol

Astrometry
Proper motion (μ)	RA: +2.763 mas/yr Dec.: −15.981 mas/yr
Parallax (π)	0.6759±0.0338 mas
Distance	4,900 ly (1,500 pc)
Absolute magnitude (M_{V})	−3.59/−3.62
Absolute bolometric magnitude (M_{bol})	−6.65±0.04/−6.7±0.04

Orbit
Primary	Y Cyg A
Companion	Y Cyg B
Period (P)	2.99633210±0.00000031 d
Semi-major axis (a)	28.72 R_{☉}
Eccentricity (e)	0.14508
Inclination (i)	86.474±0.019°
Periastron epoch (T)	2,446,308.66407±0.0001
Argument of periastron (ω) (secondary)	312.514°
Argument of periastron (ω) (primary)	132.514±0.052°

Details

Primary
Mass	17.72±0.35 M_{☉}
Radius	5.785±0.091 R_{☉}
Luminosity	36,000 L_{☉}
Surface gravity (log g)	4.161±0.014 cgs
Temperature	33,200±200 K
Rotational velocity (v sin i)	132 km/s
Age	2 Myr

Secondary
Mass	17.73±0.3 M_{☉}
Radius	5.816±0.063 R_{☉}
Luminosity	37,700 L_{☉}
Surface gravity (log g)	4.157±0.01 cgs
Temperature	33,521±40 K
Rotational velocity (v sin i)	132 km/s
Age	2 Myr

Other designations
- Y Cyg, HD 198846, HIP 102999

Database references
SIMBAD	data

Y Cygni is an eclipsing and double-lined spectroscopic binary star system in the constellation of Cygnus. It is located about 4,900 light-years from Earth. The system was one of the first binaries with a convincing detection of the apsidal precession.

The two stars, being O-type main-sequence stars, orbit each other with a period of nearly 3 days.

== Observation history ==
The early type of Y Cyg made it a popular target for astronomers in the past, and spectroscopic orbits have been historically computed numerous times. The first of these studies was published in 1920 by John Stanley Plaskett. Extensive spectroscopic studies of Y Cyg were carried out as early as 1930. Several follow-ups to these have been published in 1959, 1971, and 1980. The latter of these contained an estimate of the period of apsidal precession.
