= MACHO*05:34:41.3−69:31:39 =

Massive Binary star system in the Large Magellanic Cloud

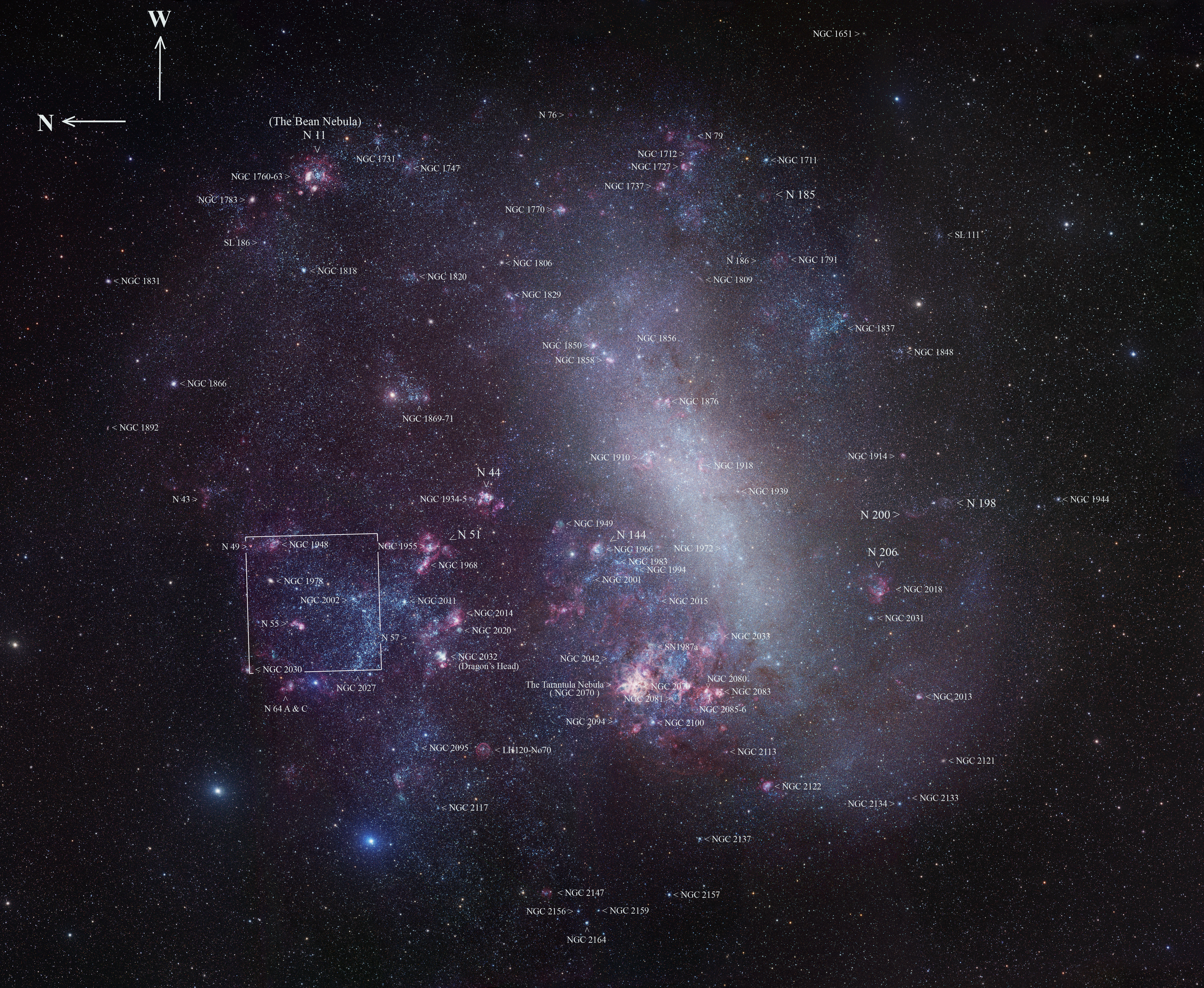

Observation data Epoch J2000.0 Equinox ICRS
- Constellation: Dorado
- Right ascension: 05^{h} 34^{m} 41.3^{s}
- Declination: −69° 31′ 39″
- Apparent magnitude (V): 13.54 (-13.89) - 13.91

Characteristics
- Evolutionary stage: Blue supergiant + Main-sequence
- Spectral type: O3If* + O6V
- Variable type: Eclipsing binary

Astrometry
| Proper motion (μ) | RA: 1.682 mas/yr Dec.: 0.602 mas/yr |
| Distance | 163,000 ly |

Orbit
| Primary | Supergiant star |
| Secondary | A |
| Period (P) | 1.40474 days |
| Semi-major axis (a) | 22.2 ± 0.2 R⊙ |
| Inclination (i) | 67° ± 1° |
| Semi-amplitude (K_{2}) (secondary) | 263 ± 3 km/s |

Details

A
| Mass | 41 ± 1.2 M_{☉} |
| Radius | 9.6 ± 0.02 R_{☉} |
| Temperature | 50,000 K |

B
| Mass | 27 ± 1.2 M_{☉} |
| Radius | 8.0 ± 0.05 R_{☉} |
| Temperature | 49,500 K |

Other designations
- MACHO*05:34:41.3−69:31:39, OGLE BRIGHT-LMC-ECL-17, 2MASS J05344134-6931386

Database references
| SIMBAD | data |

MACHO*05:34:41.3−69:31:39 is an eclipsing binary star system located in the Large Magellanic Cloud (LMC), within the LH 54 OB association. Comprising two massive early-type O stars, an O3 If* supergiant and an O6 V main-sequence star. It is a rare example of an overcontact binary with a short orbital period. The system is notable for its high stellar masses and strong binary interactions, providing valuable insights into massive star evolution in a low-metallicity environment.

== Properties ==
MACHO*05:34:41.3−69:31:39 is an overcontact eclipsing binary with a circular orbit, analyzed using photometric data from the MACHO project and spectroscopic observations. The stars are in an overcontact configuration, filling or exceeding their Roche lobes, which leads to significant interaction and possible mass transfer. The observed masses are lower than those expected for single O3 stars (~100 M⊙), likely due to binary evolution processes.

The system exhibits an O'Connell effect in its light curve, with asymmetric maxima and slight variations in eclipse depths, possibly indicating non-equilibrium atmospheres or circumstellar material. Its short orbital period and high masses make it a key target for studying massive binary evolution. The system has been referenced in studies of contact binaries and spectroscopic classifications of early O stars in the LMC.

== Significance ==
As one of the most massive known binaries in the LMC, MACHO*05:34:41.3−69:31:39 offers a unique opportunity to study the evolution of massive stars in a low-metallicity environment, similar to that of the early universe. Its overcontact nature and strong interactions provide constraints for evolutionary models of massive binaries. Further high-resolution spectroscopy and ultraviolet observations have been suggested to refine its parameters and investigate stellar winds or emission features.
