= V1936 Aquilae =

Blue supergiant star in the constellation Aquila

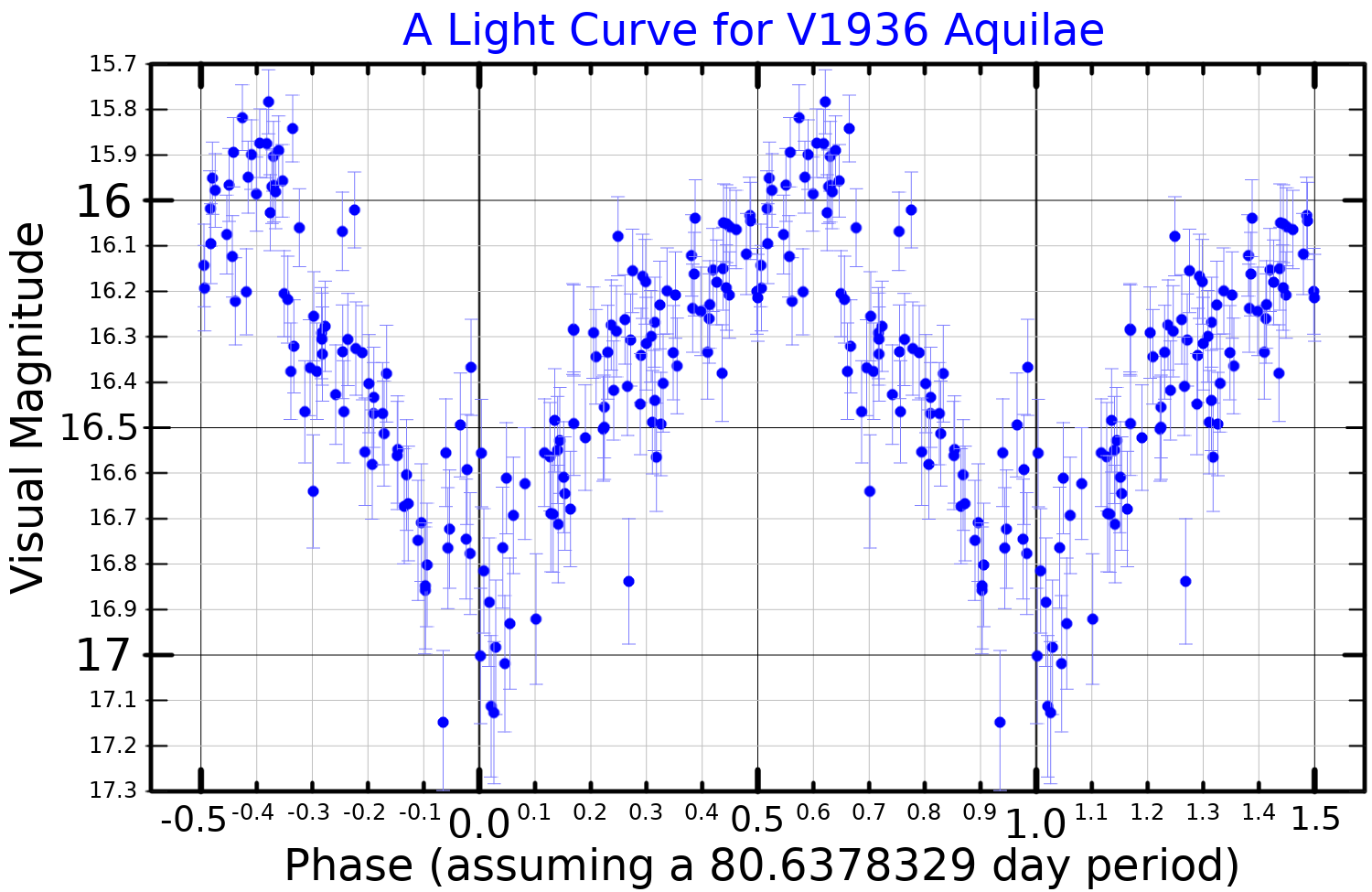
- A visual band light curve for V1936 Aquilae, plotted from ASAS-SN data

Observation data Epoch J2000 Equinox ICRS
- Constellation: Aquila
- Right ascension: 19^{h} 23^{m} 47.64119^{s}
- Declination: 14° 36′ 39.0612″
- Apparent magnitude (V): 15.1

Characteristics
- Evolutionary stage: Blue supergiant
- Spectral type: O4I
- Variable type: cLBV

Astrometry
Proper motion (μ)	RA: +6.500 mas/yr Dec.: −55.796 mas/yr
Parallax (π)	0.1462±0.0.598 mas
Distance	6,000 pc

Details
Mass	25 M_{☉}
Radius	48 - 145 R_{☉}
Luminosity	562,000 L_{☉}
Temperature	13,213 K
Age	2.3 (3-6) Myr

Other designations
- LS1, 2MASS J19234764+1436391

Database references
SIMBAD	data

V1936 Aquilae is a blue supergiant and candidate Luminous blue variable located in the nebula Westerhout 51, in the constellation Aquila, about 20,000 light years away. The star was originally identified as a massive star in 2000, and was thought to be an O-type supergiant. However, subsequent analyses have shown it to be not O but B-type, as well as being possibly an LBV. The star was shown to be a variable star by Luboš Kohoutek and R. Wehmeyer in 2004.

== Properties ==
V1936 Aquilae is a very luminous star. Recent measurements hint at a bolometric luminosity of around 560,000 L_{☉}, assuming a distance of 6 kiloparsecs, consistent with the distance of Westerhout 51, the very large H II region (nebula) it is located in. The star likely has a temperature of around 13,200 K. The Stefan-Boltzmann Law suggests a radius of around 143 times that of the Sun.
