= BE Ursae Majoris =

Variable star in the constellation Ursa Major

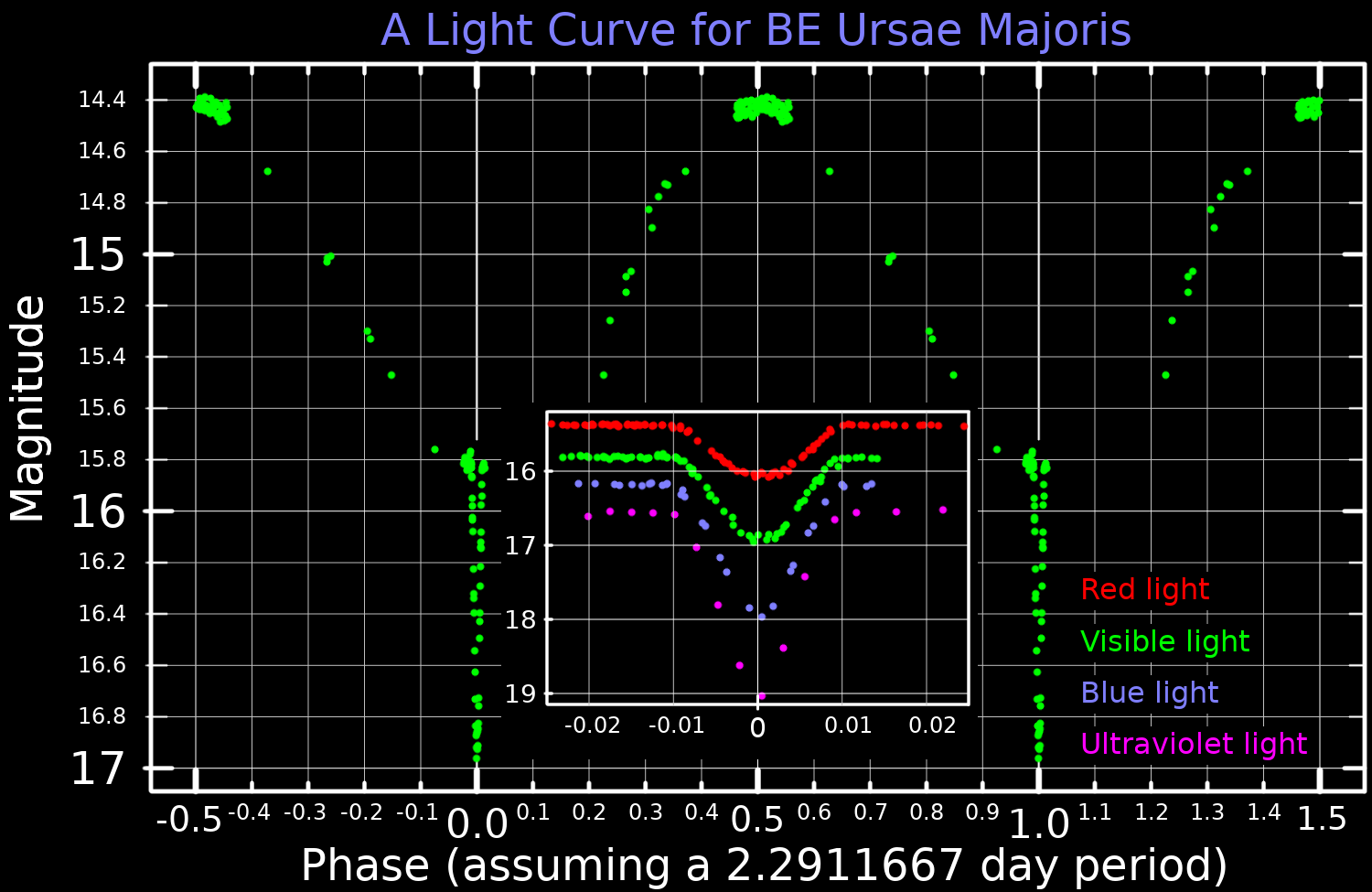
- A light curve for BE Ursae Majoris, adapted from Shimanskii et al. (2008). The inset plot shows the time around the eclipse with an expanded scale.

Observation data Epoch J2000 Equinox ICRS
- Constellation: Ursa Major
- Right ascension: 11^{h} 57^{m} 44.828^{s}
- Declination: +48° 56′ 18.31″
- Apparent magnitude (V): 14.8 to 17.8

Characteristics
- Spectral type: sdO + K3-4V
- Variable type: Detached Algol

Astrometry
Radial velocity (R_{v})	−67±2 km/s
Proper motion (μ)	RA: 10.706 mas/yr Dec.: −12.783 mas/yr
Parallax (π)	0.7079±0.0257 mas
Distance	4,600 ± 200 ly (1,410 ± 50 pc)

Orbit
Period (P)	2.2912 days
Semi-major axis (a)	6.89±0.14 R_{☉}
Eccentricity (e)	0.14±0.01
Inclination (i)	82.6±0.2°
Semi-amplitude (K_{1}) (primary)	103 km/s

Details

Subdwarf O star
Mass	0.59±0.07 M_{☉}
Radius	0.046±0.002 R_{☉}
Luminosity	436+121 −98 L_{☉}
Surface gravity (log g)	6.9±0.02 cgs
Temperature	123,000±5,000 K

K-class dwarf
Mass	0.25±0.08 M_{☉}
Radius	0.94±0.03 R_{☉}
Luminosity	0.405+0.083 −0.071 L_{☉}
Surface gravity (log g)	3.9±0.1 cgs
Temperature	4,750±150 K

Other designations
- PG 1155+492, SVS 1424, BE UMa, 2MASS J11574483+4856184

Database references
SIMBAD	data

BE Ursae Majoris is a binary star system in the northern circumpolar constellation of Ursa Major, abbreviated BE UMa. The two components are an unusual K-class dwarf star and a subdwarf O star, borderline white dwarf. It is classified as a detached Algol variable and ranges in brightness from an apparent visual magnitude of 14.8 down to 17.8. This is too faint to be visible to the naked eye. The distance to this system is approximately 4,600 light years based on parallax measurements.

The variability of SVS 1424 was announced in 1964 by N. E. Kurochkin from Sternberg, and was found to have a period of 2.291 days while ranging in brightness from magnitude 14.1 down to 15.6. After being assigned the variable star designation BE UMa, it was discovered to be a source of hot ultraviolet emission with a helium-rich spectrum by D. H. Ferguson and associates in 1981. B. Margon and associates found variability of spectral features on a time scale as low as a few hours. They interpreted this as a detached binary system consisting of a compact, high temperature white dwarf and a cool red dwarf star. The outer layers of the cooler star are being ionized by radiation from the hotter component, and the changing orientation of this heated region over the course of an orbit is creating a sinusoidal variability of about 1.5 magnitudes.

In 1982, a deep eclipse was discovered in the light curve by H. Ando and associates. This put a strong limit on the possible models for the system, which indicated that the compact component is a hot O-type subdwarf. D. Crampton and associates in 1983 found that the temperature and radius of the cool component suggested that it is an evolved subgiant star. At present, no mass transfer is taking place, but the system appears to be evolving into a cataclysmic variable as the subdwarf cools to become a normal white dwarf.

In 1995, J. Liebert and associates discovered that the system is surrounded by a planetary nebula with a diameter of 3′, which was likely shed when the present day subdwarf was leaving the asymptotic giant branch stage. The two components would have shared a common envelope as little as 10,000 years ago. As a result, rather than being a subgiant, the cool component has not yet reached the thermal equilibrium of a late dwarf star. The pair have a circular orbit with a period of 2.2911658 days and a separation of 7.5±0.5 R_{☉}. The orbital plane is inclined at an angle of 84°±1° to the line of sight from the Earth.
