= LY Aurigae =

Binary star in the constellation Auriga

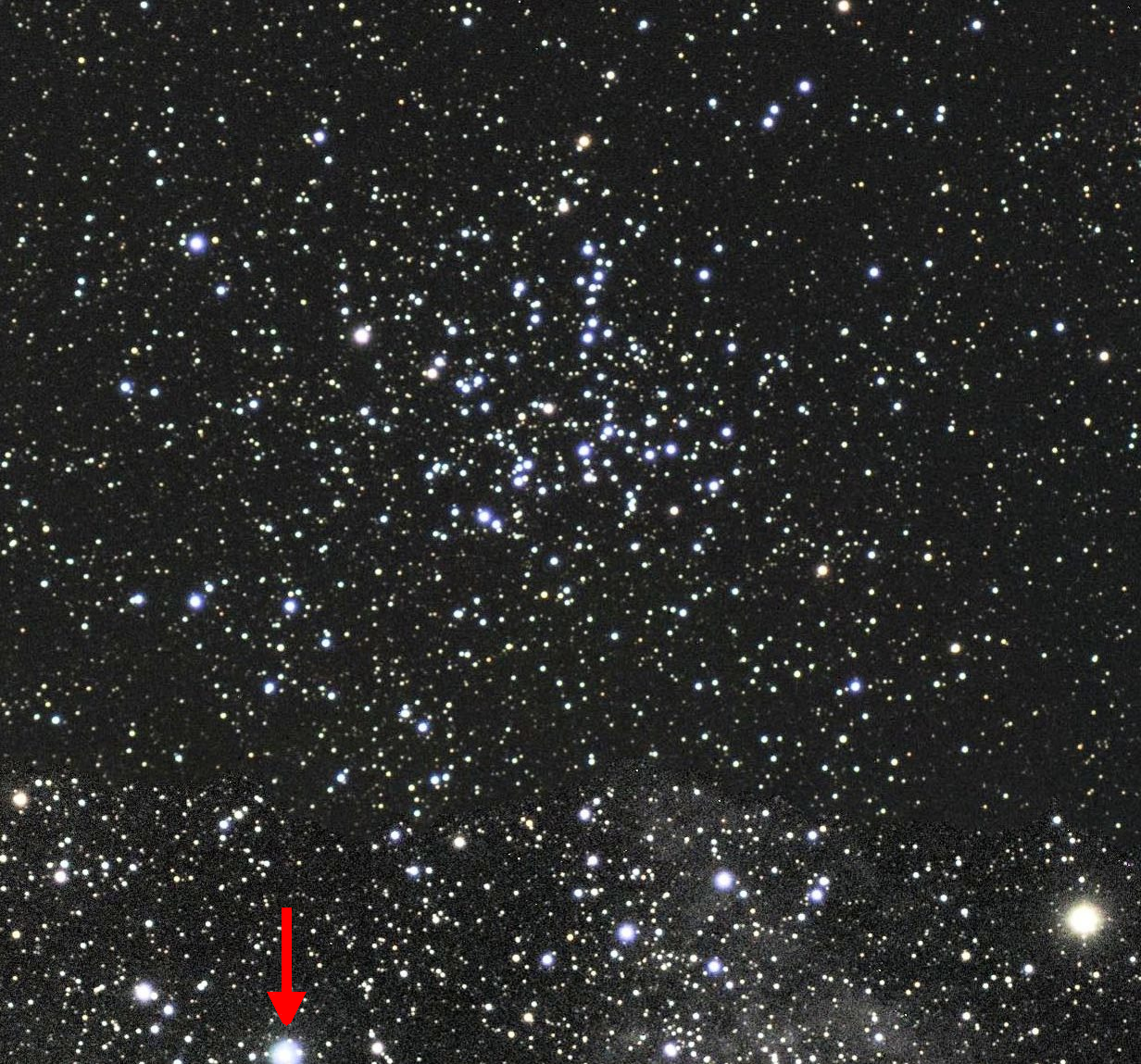
- LY Aurigae is the bright star, with the red arrow pointing at it, in the southeast corner of this picture of Messier 38

Observation data Epoch J2000 Equinox ICRS
- Constellation: Auriga
- Right ascension: 05^{h} 29^{m} 42.650^{s}
- Declination: +35° 22′ 30.09″
- Apparent magnitude (V): 6.85 (6.66 - 7.35)

Characteristics
- Spectral type: O9II + O9III + B0.5III
- U−B color index: −0.78
- B−V color index: +0.20
- Variable type: β Lyr

Astrometry
Radial velocity (R_{v})	5.40 km/s
Proper motion (μ)	RA: −0.20±3.19 mas/yr Dec.: −1.17±2.07 mas/yr
Parallax (π)	3.28±2.40 mas
Distance	6,800 ly (2,090 pc) (Note: Using LY Aurigae's distance modulus of 11.6, its distance from Earth can be calculated by the following equation: $$d = 10^{\frac{\mu}{5}+1}$$)
Absolute magnitude (M_{V})	−5.62 + −5.11 + −4.43

Orbit
Primary	Aa
Name	Ab
Period (P)	4.0025 days
Semi-major axis (a)	36.1 R_{☉}
Eccentricity (e)	0.0
Inclination (i)	87.7°
Semi-amplitude (K_{1}) (primary)	161.9 km/s
Semi-amplitude (K_{2}) (secondary)	294.3 km/s

Orbit
Primary	Ba
Name	Bb
Period (P)	20.4642 days
Eccentricity (e)	0.246
Semi-amplitude (K_{1}) (primary)	33.0 km/s

Details

Aa
Mass	25.5 M_{☉}
Radius	16.1 R_{☉}
Luminosity	214,000 L_{☉}
Surface gravity (log g)	3.425 cgs
Temperature	31,000 K
Rotational velocity (v sin i)	194 km/s

Ab
Mass	14.0 M_{☉}
Radius	12.6 R_{☉}
Luminosity	135,000 L_{☉}
Surface gravity (log g)	3.378 cgs
Temperature	31,150 K
Rotational velocity (v sin i)	152 km/s

B
Luminosity	47,000 L_{☉}
Surface gravity (log g)	4.00 cgs
Temperature	26,000 K
Rotational velocity (v sin i)	30 km/s
Age	5 Myr

Other designations
- LY Aurigae, BD+35°1137, HD 35921, SAO 58105, HIP 25733, WDS J05297+3523, AAVSO 0523+35

Database references
SIMBAD	data

LY Aurigae is a multiple star system in the constellation Auriga. It is an eclipsing binary variable star, dropping in brightness by 0.7 magnitudes every 4 days. The system is around 6,800 light years away in the Auriga OB1 stellar association.

== System ==
LY Aurigae is a close visual binary. The two stars are magnitude 6.85 and magnitude 8.35 0.6 arc-seconds apart. Each star is also a spectroscopic binary.

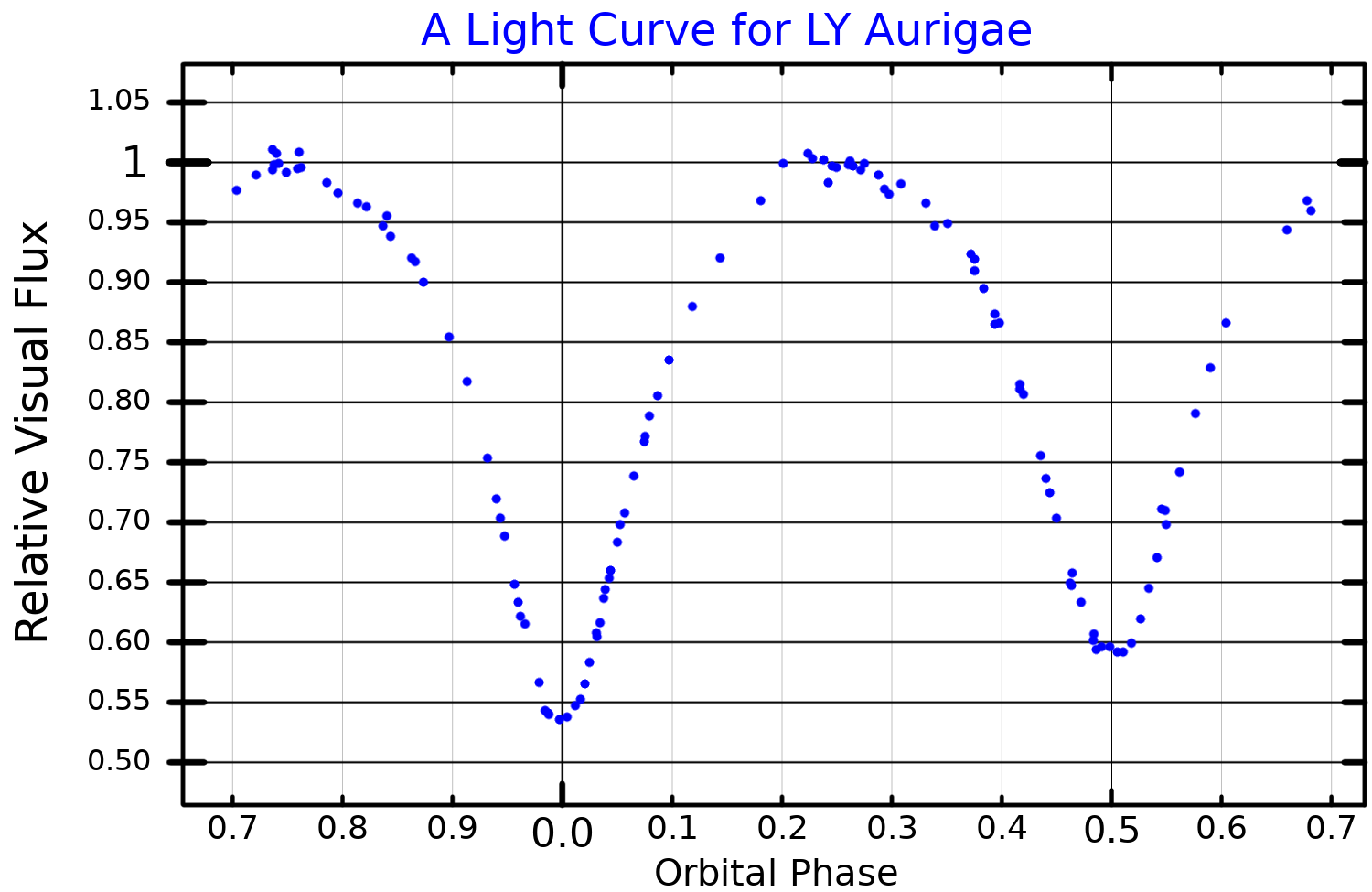
A visual band light curve for LY Aurigae, adapted from Mayer et al. (2013)

In 1965, Pavel Mayer reported that the star, then called HD 35921, is a variable star. By 1968, he had determined that it is an eclipsing binary. It was given its variable star designation, LY Aurigae, in 1970. LY Aur A is a double-lined spectroscopic binary with an O9 bright giant and an O9 giant star in contact and eclipsing each other as they orbit every 4 days. It is classified as a Beta Lyr eclipsing variable system. The primary eclipse is 0.69 magnitudes deep and the secondary eclipse is 0.60 magnitudes. Because of the contact nature of the system and the deformed shapes of the stars, the magnitude varies constantly throughout the orbital cycle. The orbital period is slowly changing due to mass exchange between the stars. Each star is over a hundred thousand times the luminosity of the sun.

LY Aur B is a single-lined spectroscopic binary with an orbital period of 20.5 days. It is probably an early B main sequence star and the companion is undetectable. The two stars combined are 47,000 times the luminosity of the sun.

== See also ==
- V* LY Aur
- HIC 25733
- CCDM J05297+3523
- Image LY Aurigae
