= VFTS 102 =

Star in the constellation Dorado

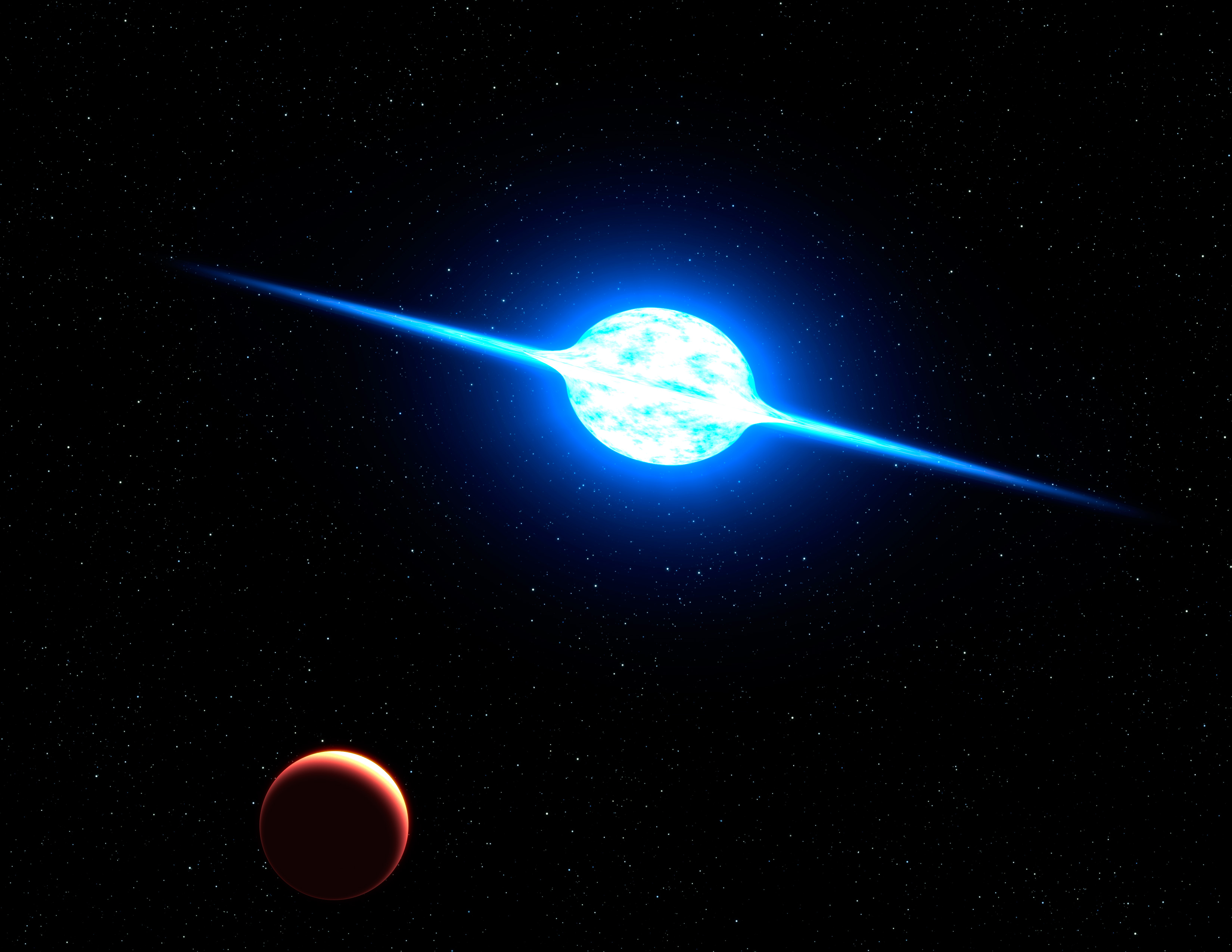
- Artistic depiction of VFTS 102

Observation data Epoch J2000 Equinox ICRS
- Constellation: Dorado
- Right ascension: 05^{h} 37^{m} 39.248^{s}
- Declination: −69° 09′ 51.04″
- Apparent magnitude (V): 15.806

Characteristics
- Evolutionary stage: Main sequence
- Spectral type: O9:Vnnne
- U−B color index: −0.879
- B−V color index: +0.293

Astrometry
Radial velocity (R_{v})	228 km/s
Proper motion (μ)	RA: 7.3 mas/yr Dec.: 2.1 mas/yr
Distance	164,000 ly (50,000 pc)

Details
Mass	~25 M_{☉}
Luminosity	100,000 L_{☉}
Surface gravity (log g)	3.6 ± 0.5 cgs
Temperature	36,000 ± 5,000 K
Rotational velocity (v sin i)	610 ± 30 km/s

Other designations
- 2MASS J05373924-6909510

Database references
SIMBAD	data

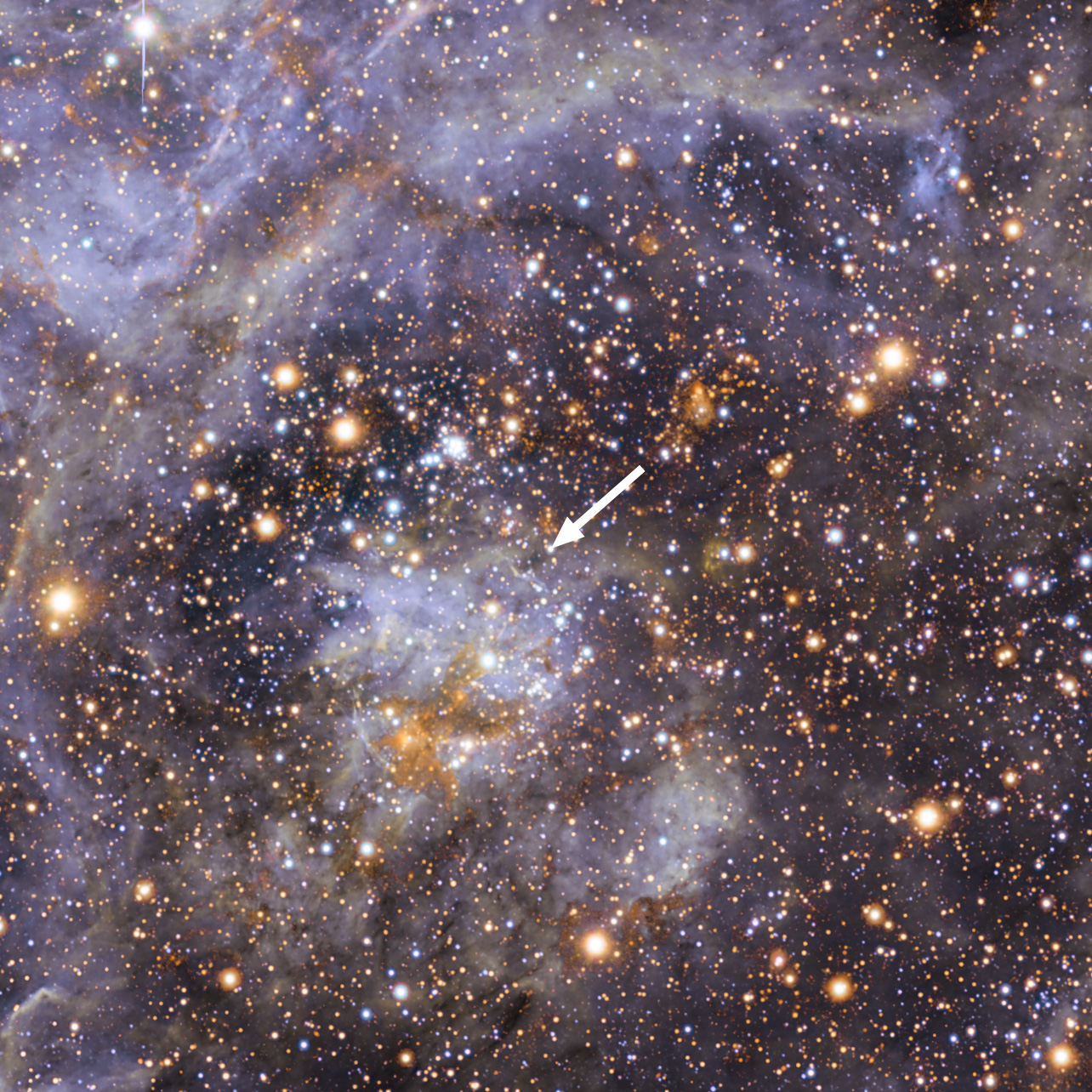
The position of VFTS 102 in Tarantula Nebula

VFTS 102 is a star located in the Tarantula Nebula, a star forming region in the Large Magellanic Cloud, a satellite galaxy of the Milky Way.

The peculiarity of this star is its projected equatorial velocity of ~610 km/s (about 2,000,000 km/h), making it the second fastest rotating massive star known alongside VFTS 285 (609 km/s), and preceded only by the WO star WR 142 which has a rotational velocity of 1000 km/s. The resulting centrifugal force tends to flatten the star; material can be lost in the loosely bound equatorial regions, allowing for the formation of a disk. The spectroscopic observations seem to confirm this, and the star is classified as Oe, possibly due to emission from such an equatorial disk of gas.

This star was observed by the VLT Flames Tarantula Survey collaboration using the VLT, Very Large Telescope in Chile. One member of this team is Matteo Cantiello, an Italian astrophysicist who emigrated to the United States and is currently working at the Kavli Institute for Theoretical Physics at University of California Santa Barbara. In 2007, together with a few collaborators, he predicted the existence of massive stars with properties very similar to VFTS 102. In its theoretical model, the extreme rotational speed is caused by the transfer of material from a companion star in a binary system. After this "cosmic dance", the donor star is predicted to explode as a supernova. The spun-up companion instead is likely to be launched out of the orbit and move away from its stellar neighbors at high speed. Such a star is called a runaway. VFTS 102 fits this theoretical model very well, being found to be a rapidly rotating runaway star and lying close to a pulsar and a supernova remnant. Other scenarios, like a dynamical ejection from the core of the star cluster R136, are also possible.
