= Abell 63 =

Planetary nebula in the constellation of Sagitta

Emission nebula
- Planetary nebula
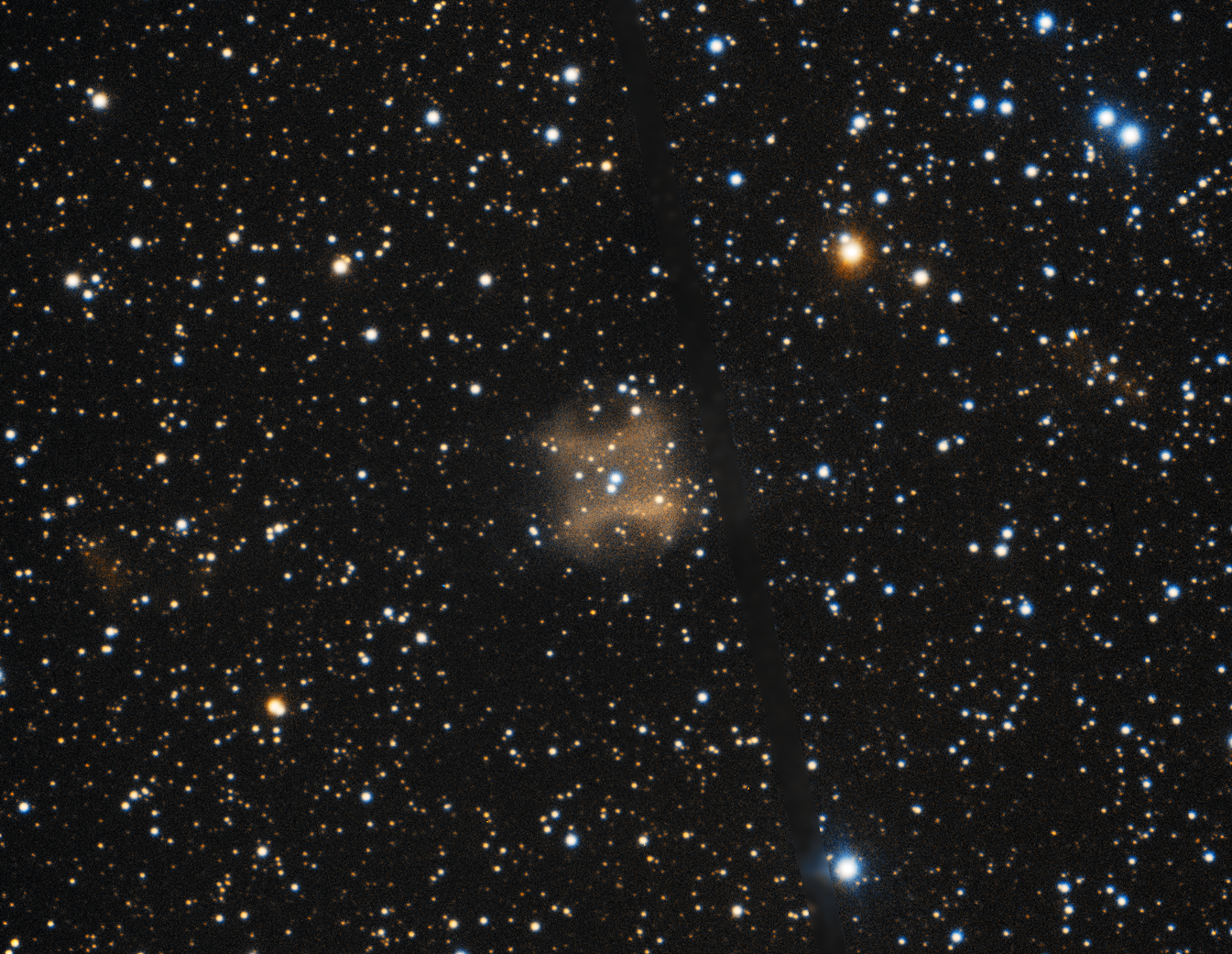
- Abell 63 nebula (center)

Observation data: J2000 epoch
- Right ascension: 19^{h} 42^{m} 10.290^{s}
- Declination: +17° 05′ 14.46″
- Distance: 8,810 ± 650 ly (2,700±200 pc)
- Constellation: Sagitta
- Designations: UU Sge, WD 1939+169, PN A55 51

Abell 63 is a planetary nebula with an eclipsing binary central star system in the northern constellation of Sagitta. Based on parallax measurements of the central star, it is located at a distance of approximately 8,810 light years from the Sun. The systemic radial velocity of the nebula is +41±2 km/s. The nuclear star system is the progenitor of the nebula and it has a combined apparent visual magnitude of 14.67. During mid eclipse the magnitude drops to 19.24.

The star H.V. 5452 was found to be a candidate eclipsing binary system in 1932 by Dorrit Hoffleit, and it was given the variable star designation UU Sagittae (UU Sge). In 1955, George O. Abell discovered a nebula in the same region of the sky from photographic plates taken by the National Geographic Society – Palomar Observatory Sky Survey. The identifier 'Abell 63' comes from a follow-up publication by Abell in 1966, which identified the nebula as a homogeneous disk 40″ in diameter with a central star of magnitude 14.67. In 1976, Howard E. Bond noted that the positions of the variable star and the center of the nebula coincide. That same year, J. S. Miller and associates confirmed that UU Sge is an eclipsing binary, finding a period of 11^{h} 09.6^{m} with an eclipse duration of 70 minutes. The deep eclipse decreased the brightness of the pair by ~4.3 magnitudes.

The general shape of this nebula appears to be a hollow tube with a prominent hyperbolic-shaped waist. The bright central rim has faint extensions leading to end caps; the primary axis of the tube being aligned along a position angle of 34°. The overall profile has a 7:1 aspect ratio spanning an angular size of 290 × 42 arcseconds, with the ends at an equal angular distance from the center. The nebula is expanding with a velocity of 17±1 km/s. Surrounding the bright central rim is a faint circular shell, which may be the remnant of the stellar wind produced as the central star passed through the asymptotic giant branch.

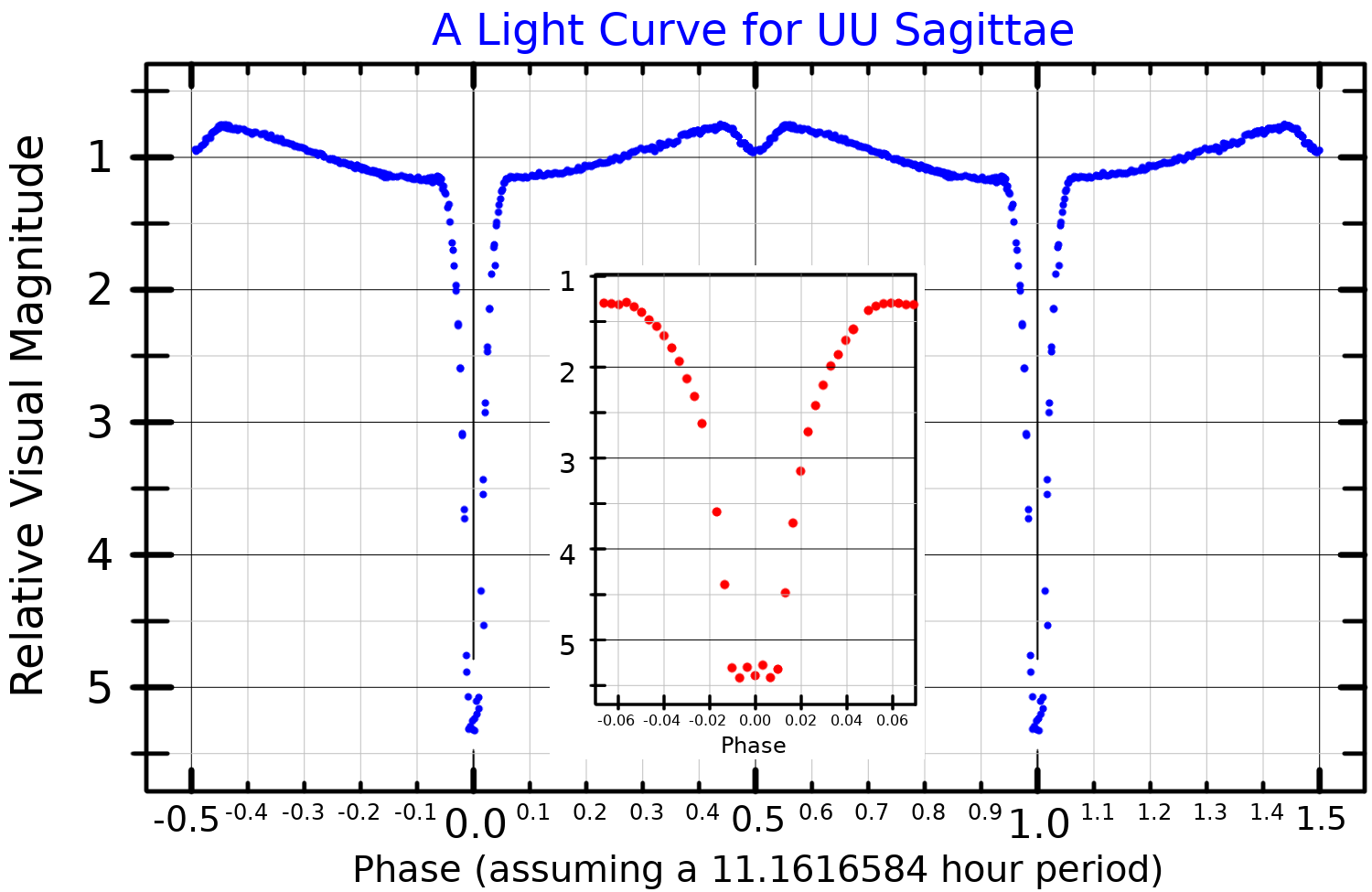
A visual band light curve for UU Sagittae. The main plot, plotted from data published by Pollacco and Bell (1993), shows the full light curve. The inset plot, plotted from data published by Bell et al. (1994), shows primary eclipse on an expanded horizontal scale.

The central system is a close detached binary with an orbital period of 11.2 hours. The length of the total eclipse of the primary component by the secondary is 13.4 minutes. They have a projected separation of at least 2.45 times the radius of the Sun. The primary is an O-type subdwarf star (sdO) that has passed through the asymptotic giant branch stage, during which it ejected the surrounding planetary nebula. It has 63% of the mass of the Sun and 35% of the Sun's radius, with an effective temperature of ~78,000 K. The secondary has the mass of an M-type main-sequence star, or 29% of the mass of the Sun. However, the effective temperature of 6,136 K is much higher than expected for an M dwarf, and the radius of 56% of the Sun is too large. This is because the point on the secondary facing the primary is being heated by its much hotter companion. The hot primary is also providing the illumination of the surrounding nebula.
