= HD 149404 =

Variable star in the constellation Scorpius

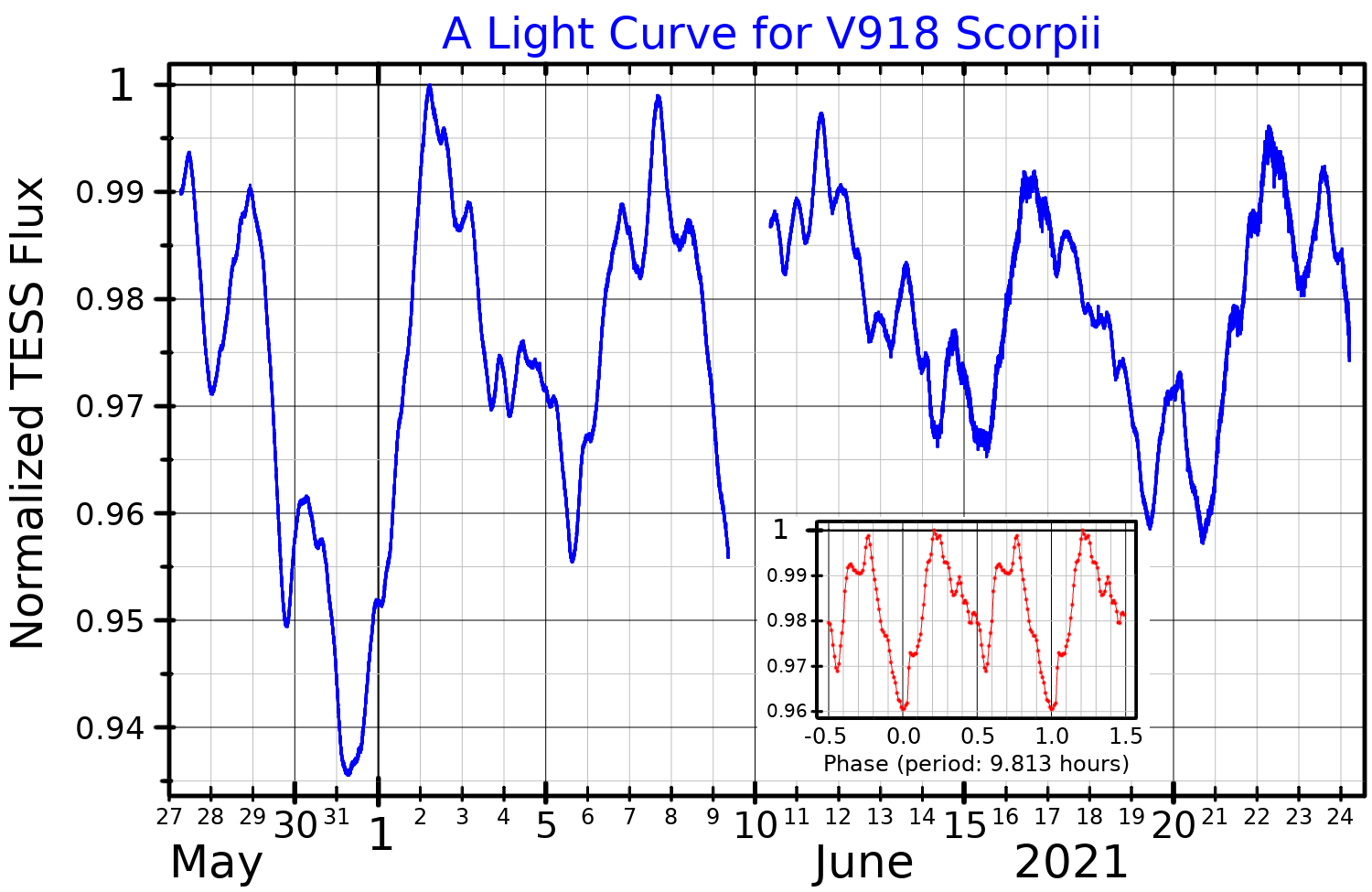
- A light curve for V918 Scorpii, plotted from TESS data. The inset plot shows the same data folded with the orbital period, and averaged into 100 bins per orbit.

Observation data Epoch J2000.0 Equinox J2000.0
- Constellation: Scorpius
- Right ascension: 16^{h} 36^{m} 22.56285^{s}
- Declination: −42° 51′ 31.9021″
- Apparent magnitude (V): 5.42 - 5.50

Characteristics
- Spectral type: O7.5I(f) + ON9.7I
- U−B color index: −0.55
- B−V color index: +0.40
- Variable type: ELL

Astrometry
Proper motion (μ)	RA: −3.375±0.081 mas/yr Dec.: −3.306±0.069 mas/yr
Parallax (π)	0.7601±0.0709 mas
Distance	4,300 ± 400 ly (1,300 ± 100 pc)

Orbit
Period (P)	9.81475 d
Eccentricity (e)	0.0 (assumed)
Periastron epoch (T)	2451680.279±0.174
Semi-amplitude (K_{1}) (primary)	59.7±2.0 km/s
Semi-amplitude (K_{2}) (secondary)	98.7±3.2 km/s

Details

Primary
Mass	50.5±20.1 M_{☉}
Radius	19.3±2.2 R_{☉}
Luminosity	430000+52000 −46000 L_{☉}
Surface gravity (log g)	3.55±0.15} cgs
Temperature	34000±0.15 K

Secondary
Mass	31.9±9.5 M_{☉}
Radius	25.9±3.4 R_{☉}
Luminosity	380000+37000 −34000 L_{☉}
Surface gravity (log g)	3.05±0.15 cgs
Temperature	28000±0.15 K

Other designations
- V918 Sco, HIP 81305, HR 6164, SAO 226953

Database references
SIMBAD	data

HD 149404, also known as HR 6164 and V918 Scorpii, is a star about 4,300 light years from the Earth, in the constellation Scorpius. It is a 5th magnitude star, so it will be faintly visible to the naked eye of an observer far from city lights. It is a rotating ellipsoidal variable, a binary star for which the two stars' combined brightness varies slightly, from magnitude 5.42 to 5.50, during their 9.8 day orbital period. It is one of the brightest members of the Ara OB1 association, which has the open cluster NGC 6193 at its center.

The brightness variability of HD 149404 was marginally detected by the Argentinian astronomer Alenjandro Feinstein, during a photoelectric photometry study undertaken from 1963 through 1965. It was given the variable star designation V918 Scorpii in 1980. In 1977, Peter Conti et al. discovered that HD 149404 has double spectral lines, implying it is a spectroscopic binary. Philip Massey and Peter Conti derived the first set of orbital elements for the binary system, in 1979.

The secondary star in the HD 149404 system is believed to have originally been the more massive of the two, but it is now less massive than the primary due to mass transfer caused by Roche lobe overflow in the past. The secondary may still be close to filling its Roche lobe. It is a rare ON supergiant, a star with unusually strong absorption lines of nitrogen in its stellar spectrum. Spectroscopic studies show that both stars have a stellar wind and a shock is formed where the two winds collide, which produces emission line features.
