= IC 4593 =

Nebula in the constellation Hercules

Nebula
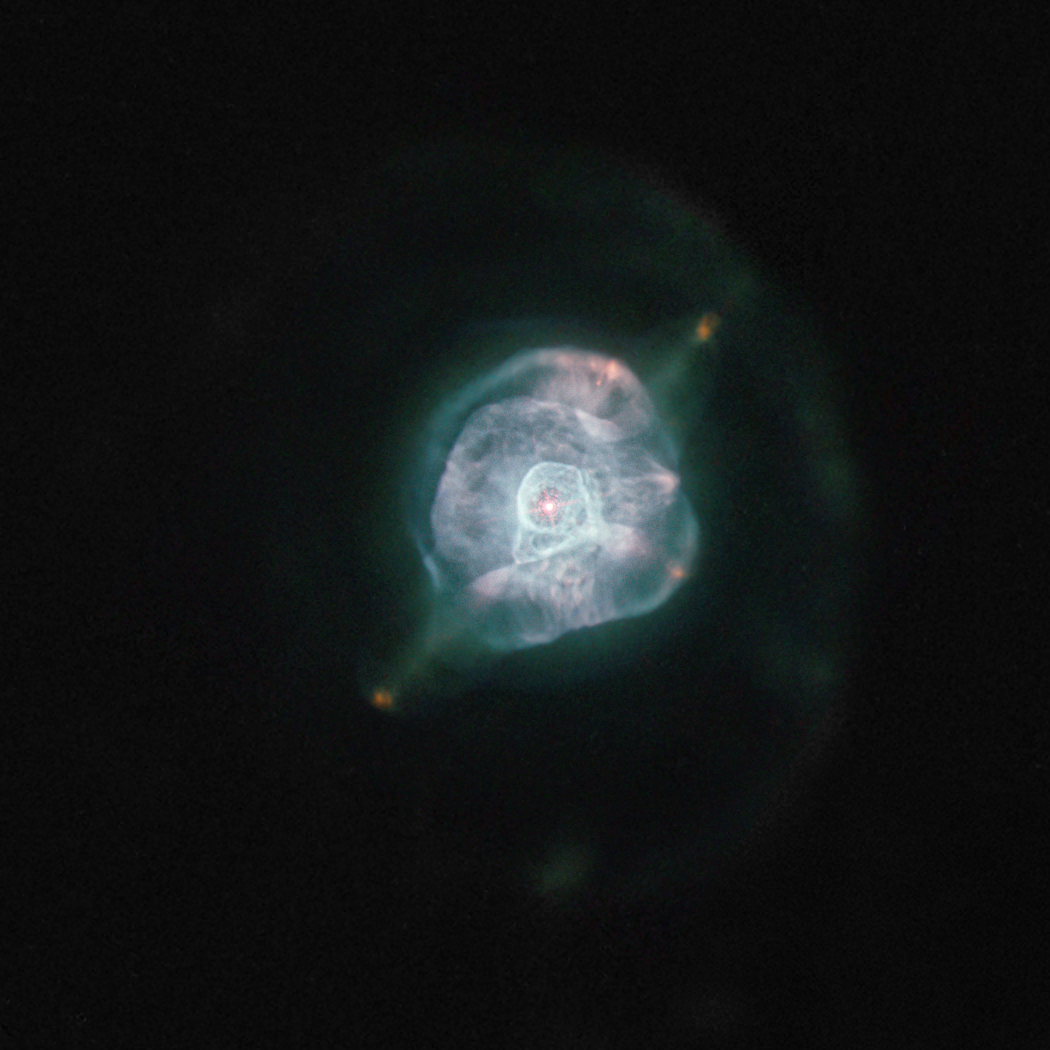
- IC 4593 imaged by astronomer Judy Schmidt

Observation data: J2000.0 epoch
- Class: O7f
- Right ascension: 16^{h} 11^{m} 44.5^{s}
- Declination: +12° 04′ 17″
- Distance: 7,900 ly
- Apparent magnitude (V): 10.7
- Apparent dimensions (V): 0.22 × 0.22
- Constellation: Hercules

IC 4593 (also known as the White-Eyed Pea Nebula) is a planetary nebula in the constellation Hercules. It was first discovered in 1907 by astronomer Williamina Fleming. The nebula is approximately 0.96 light-years across. At the center of the nebula is a hot white dwarf that's known as HD 145649. It is an O-type star with a spectral type of O7f. The temperature of the white dwarf is approximately around 30,000 to 40,000 K.

A study published in 2020 found that there are bubbles of extremely hot gas in its inner cavities, with the gas heating to over a million degrees. They were formed because of stellar winds colliding with previously expelled gas.

== Characteristics ==
IC 4593 is homogeneous and amorphous, with little to no clustering when compared to other planetary nebulae.

The star is surrounded by an asymmetrical inner core about 10 arcseconds across. The core has a faint but fast gas flow, reaching speeds of over 100 kilometers per second. The star has a dense ring-like structure around it. There are bright, low-ionized knots that extend out of the core and into the inner halo. The knots can be best seen in nitrogen emission lines. The inner halo is partially enclosed by a shell, creating a visible arc shape or bulge near the northwest part of the halo.

The outer halo is irregluar and unaligned with the inner halo. The halo is faint and fragmented.
