= HD 193322 =

Star group in the constellation Cygnus

- Location of HD 193322 (circled)

Observation data Epoch J2000.0 Equinox ICRS
- Constellation: Cygnus
- HD 193322A
- Right ascension: 20^{h} 18^{m} 06.9877^{s}
- Declination: +40° 43′ 55.495″
- Apparent magnitude (V): +5.958
- HD 193322B
- Right ascension: 20^{h} 18^{m} 06.7684^{s}
- Declination: +40° 43′ 54.359″
- Apparent magnitude (V): +8.23

Characteristics

HD 193322Aa
- Evolutionary stage: main-sequence star
- Spectral type: O9Vnn

HD 193322Ab1
- Evolutionary stage: giant star
- Spectral type: O8.5 III

HD 193322Ab2
- Evolutionary stage: main-sequence star
- Spectral type: B2.5 V?

HD 193322B
- Evolutionary stage: main-sequence star
- Spectral type: B1.5 V

HD 193322C
- Evolutionary stage: main-sequence star
- Spectral type: B8 V

HD 193322D
- Evolutionary stage: main-sequence star
- Spectral type: B9 V

Astrometry

HD 193322A
Proper motion (μ)	RA: −2.488 mas/yr Dec.: −6.837 mas/yr
Parallax (π)	1.0669±0.1403 mas
Distance	approx. 3,100 ly (approx. 900 pc)

HD 193322B
Proper motion (μ)	RA: −3.070 mas/yr Dec.: −6.015 mas/yr
Parallax (π)	0.9268±0.0432 mas
Distance	3,500 ± 200 ly (1,080 ± 50 pc)

Orbit
Primary	HD 193322Aa
Name	HD 193322Ab
Period (P)	44±1 yr
Semi-major axis (a)	0.0525^{+0.0025}_{−0.0020}″
Eccentricity (e)	0.58^{+0.03}_{−0.04}
Inclination (i)	37^{+6}_{−4}°

Details

HD 193322A
Mass	Aa: 21 M_{☉} Ab1: 23 M_{☉} Ab2: 9 M_{☉}
Surface gravity (log g)	Aa: 4.0 cgs Ab1: 3.5 cgs Ab2: 4.0 cgs
Temperature	Aa: 33,000 K Ab1: 32,500 K Ab2: 20,000 K
Rotational velocity (v sin i)	Aa: 350 km/s Ab1: 40 km/s Ab2: 200 km/s
Age	7 Myr

HD 193322B
Mass	7.5 M_{☉}
Surface gravity (log g)	4.0 cgs
Temperature	23,000 K
Rotational velocity (v sin i)	100 km/s

Other designations
- HR 7767, BD+40°4103, GC 28228, 2MASS J20180697+4043554
- HD 193322A: TYC 3155-2321-1, Gaia EDR3 2062360626011542272 304.5291012654289
- HD 193322B: TYC 3155-2321-2, Gaia EDR3 2062360626009209856
- HD 193322C: UCAC2 46029301, 2MASS J20180562+4043248, Gaia EDR3 2062359152847218432
- HD 193322D: UCAC2 46029306, 2MASS J20180691+4043055, Gaia EDR3 2062359084127740032

Database references
SIMBAD	data
- A
- B
- C
- D

HD 193322 (HR 7767) is a group of six stars which appear to be at least loosely bound into a system in the constellation Cygnus. The stars comprise the core of the young open cluster Collinder 419 (Cr 419), which contains a total of 51 known stars. Another prominent member of the cluster is the eclipsing binary star V470 Cygni (HD 228911). The cluster lies at a distance of about 3500 light years and its stars are only a few million years old.

== System ==
- HD 193322
  - A
    - - Aa
    - Ab
      - Ab1
      - Ab2
  - - - B
  - - - C
  - - - D

== HD 193322A ==
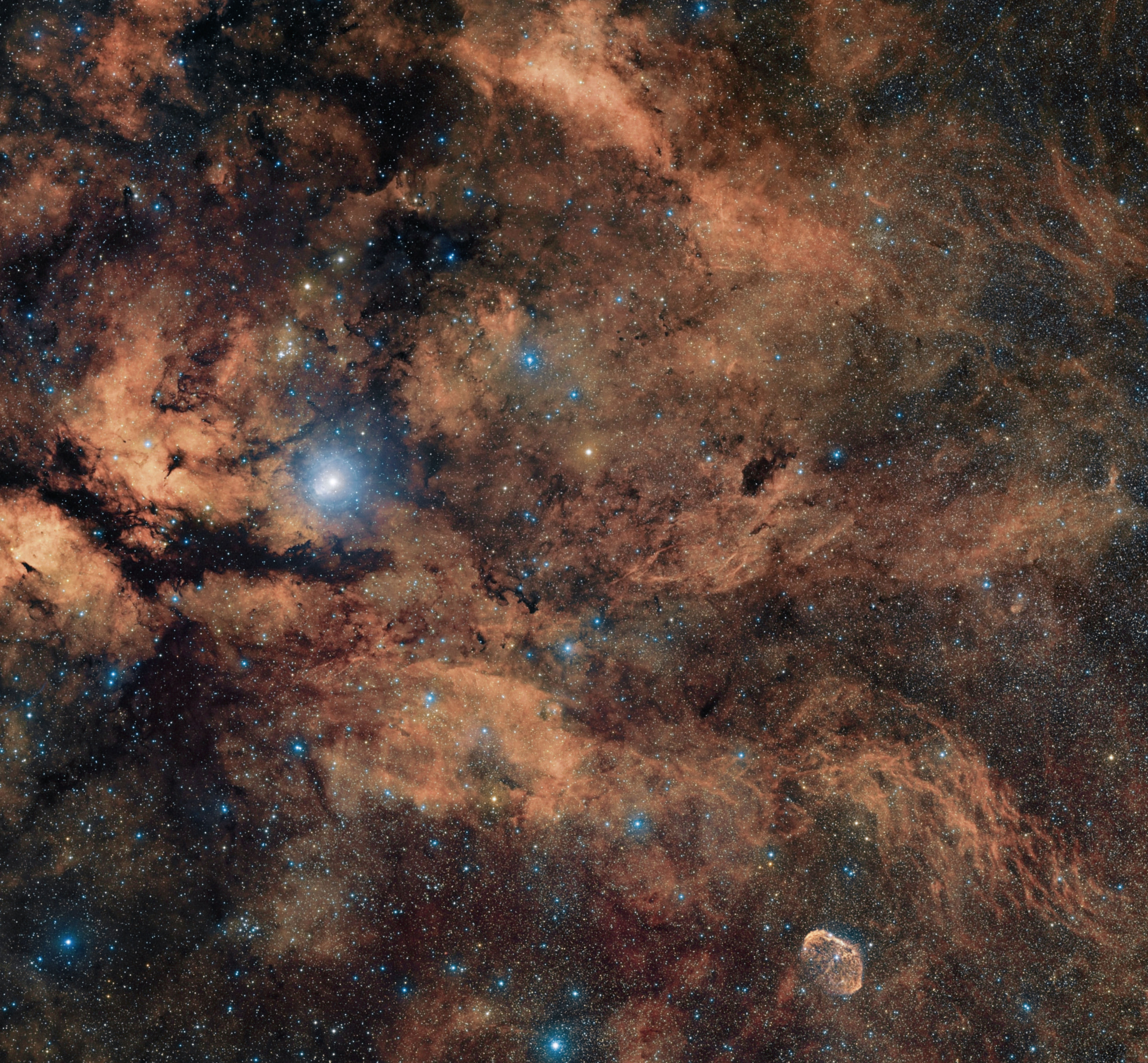
The γ Cygni region of Cygnus. HD 193322 is the blue star above and right of γ Cygni (annotated in full-size image).

The brightest and most massive component, HD 193322A, is a triple star system and emits 89% of the system's visible light. It is composed of Aa and Ab on an eccentric 44-year orbit. The binary Ab itself consists of stars Ab1 and Ab2 on a 311.03±0.25 d orbit. The total mass of the system HD193233A has been calculated to be 76.1+9.9
−7.4 M_{☉}, although the individual stellar masses give a smaller total.

HD 193222Aa has spectral class O9Vnn, indicating a main-sequence star with highly-broadened absorption lines due to rapid rotation. HD 193322Ab1 has spectral class O8.5III, although its derived physical properties suggest it may actually be on the main sequence. Its companion HD 193322Ab2 is a main-sequence star of spectral class B2.5. The Ab pair may have a combined mass and brightness greater than Aa.

== HD 193322B ==
HD 193322B is a single B-type main-sequence star separated from HD 193322A by 2.76 arcseconds on the sky, which puts them at least 2,780 astronomical units (AU) apart. Making several assumptions, the orbital period would be about 11 thousand years. HD 193322B produces 11% of the visible light emitted by the six-star system.

== Other components ==
The components HD 193322C and HD 193322D are late B-class main sequence stars, respectively 34″ and 50″ from the central star. It is unclear if the two are gravitationally bound to the system. HD 193322D is a suspected Lambda Boötis star.
