= HD 116852 =

Runaway star with ionizing gas

Observation data Epoch J2000.0 Equinox J2000.0 (ICRS)
- Constellation: Chamaeleon
- Right ascension: 13^{h} 30^{m} 23.51858^{s}
- Declination: −78° 51′ 20.5477″
- Apparent magnitude (V): 8.47

Characteristics
- Spectral type: O8.5 II-III ((f))
- U−B color index: −0.99
- B−V color index: −0.09

Astrometry
Radial velocity (R_{v})	−47±7.4 km/s
Proper motion (μ)	RA: +7.197 mas/yr Dec.: −7.736 mas/yr
Parallax (π)	0.2823±0.0293 mas
Distance	6,309 pc
Absolute bolometric magnitude (M_{bol})	−9.0

Details
Mass	15±0.7 M_{☉}
Radius	18.9±1.0 R_{☉}
Luminosity (bolometric)	16,187 L_{☉}
Surface gravity (log g)	3.52±0.04 cgs
Temperature	34,000±500 K
Metallicity [Fe/H]	−0.2 dex
Rotational velocity (v sin i)	136 km/s
Age	~5 Myr

Other designations
- CD−78°545, CPD−78°813, HD 116852, HIP 65890, TYC 9434-1988-1, GSC 09434-01988

Database references
SIMBAD	data

HD 116852, also known as HIP 65890, is a solitary, whitish-blue-hued star located in the southern circumpolar constellation Chamaeleon. It has an apparent magnitude of 8.47, making it readily visible in binoculars but not to the naked eye. The star is located relatively far at a distance of 6,310 parsecs but is drifting closer with a heliocentric radial velocity of −47 km/s. At its current distance, HD 116852's brightness is diminished by 0.67 magnitudes due to extinction from interstellar dust. It has an absolute bolometric magnitude of −9.0.

HD 116852 has a stellar classification of O8.5 II-III ((f)), indicating that it is an evolved O-type star with a luminosity class intermediate between a bright giant and a regular giant star. The spectrum also includes a strong He II absorption accompanied by weak N III emissions. It has 15 times the mass of the Sun and 19 times the solar radius. It radiates a bolometric luminosity 16,187 times greater than the Sun from its photosphere at an effective temperature of 34,000 K. HD 116852 is metal deficient ([Fe/H] = −0.20) and is estimated to be 5 million years old. Like many hot stars the object spins rapidly, having a projected rotational velocity of 136 km/s.

There is a cloud of highly ionized gas in the line-of-sight towards HD 116852. It was first noticed by astronomers Kenneth R. Sembach and Blair D. Savage in 1994. The cloud in question contains an overabundance of carbon including other chemical elements such as silicon, phosphorus, nickel, and germanium. HD 116852 has a high galactic latitude, indicating that it is currently in the galactic halo between the Scutum-Centaurus Arm and the Sagittarius-Carina Arm. It is most likely a runaway star that was ejected from its birthplace into its current location.
