= HD 92206 =

Multiple star system in constellation Carina

- Location of HD 92206 (circled)

Observation data Epoch J2000 Equinox ICRS
- Constellation: Carina
- HD 92206A
- Right ascension: 10^{h} 37^{m} 22.28065^{s}
- Declination: −58° 37′ 22.8526″
- Apparent magnitude (V): +8.219
- HD 92206B
- Right ascension: 10^{h} 37^{m} 22.96508^{s}
- Declination: −58° 37′ 22.9596″
- Apparent magnitude (V): 9.15
- HD 92206C
- Right ascension: 06^{h} 13^{m} 47.17685^{s}
- Declination: −58° 37′ 22.9596″
- Apparent magnitude (V): 8.966

Characteristics

HD 92206A
- Spectral type: O6.5V + O6.5V, O6V((f))z (combined)
- B−V color index: 0.096
- J−H color index: −0.025
- J−K color index: 0.084

HD 92206B
- Spectral type: O6.5V or O6V((f))z
- J−H color index: 0.163
- J−K color index: −0.047

HD 92206C
- Spectral type: O8V + O9.7V + B2:
- B−V color index: 0.119
- J−H color index: 0.064
- J−K color index: 0.084

Astrometry

HD 92206A
Proper motion (μ)	RA: −7.290 mas/yr Dec.: +2.814 mas/yr
Parallax (π)	0.3881±0.0217 mas
Distance	8,400 ± 500 ly (2,600 ± 100 pc)

HD 92206B
Proper motion (μ)	RA: −7.176 mas/yr Dec.: +2.844 mas/yr
Parallax (π)	0.4395±0.015 mas
Distance	7,400 ± 300 ly (2,280 ± 80 pc)

HD 92206C
Proper motion (μ)	RA: −7.538 mas/yr Dec.: +2.206 mas/yr
Parallax (π)	0.6476±0.0866 mas
Distance	approx. 5,000 ly (approx. 1,500 pc)

Orbit
Primary	HD 92206C O8V
Name	HD 92206C O9.7V
Period (P)	2.022504(12) d
Semi-major axis (a)	21.8±0.4 R_{☉}
Eccentricity (e)	0
Semi-amplitude (K_{1}) (primary)	209.3±4.6 km/s
Semi-amplitude (K_{2}) (secondary)	289.1±7.8 km/s

Details

HD 92206 Aa
Luminosity	170,000 L_{☉}
Age	≲1 Myr

HD 92206 Ab
Mass	0.5-1 M_{☉}
Age	~1 Myr

HD 92206 B
Luminosity	170,000 L_{☉}

HD 92206 Ca1
Luminosity	112,000 L_{☉}
Rotational velocity (v sin i)	146±30 km/s

HD 92206 Ca2
Rotational velocity (v sin i)	120±5 km/s

HD 92206C Cb
Rotational velocity (v sin i)	67±8 km/s

Other designations
- WDS J10374-5837
- HD 92206AB: CD−57°3380, CPD−57°3584, GC 14621, HD 92206, SAO 238269, PPM 339253, GSC 08613-01825, NGC 3324 2
- HD 92206A: TIC 458230570, TYC 8613-1825-1, 2MASS J10372226-5837229
- HD 92206B: TIC 458230572, 2MASS J10372295-5837230, NGC 3324 5, ALS 17532
- HD 92206C: CD−57°3378, CPD−57°3580, GC 14618, SAO 238266, PPM 339247, TIC 458230632, TYC 8613-780-1, GSC 08613-00780, 2MASS J10371860-5837419, NGC 3324 4, LS 1695

Database references
SIMBAD	data
- A
- B
- C

HD 92206 is a Henry Draper Catalogue designation given to a collection of stars in the southern constellation of Carina. It consists of two systems; HD 92206AB, where component A is itself a spectroscopic binary; and the trinary HD 92206C. They are the brightest stars in NGC 3324 and the ionizing stars of the associated emission nebula Gum 31 (IC 2599). The relationship between AB and C is disputed: some state that they are all part of a singular multiple star system, whereas others treat AB and C as neighboring star systems that together "form a compact group." All of their components are young (age ≲1 Myr), massive OB stars near the zero-age main sequence. Two other objects, HD 92206A2 and C2, have been discovered in the immediate vicinity, which are both likely less massive late-type stars based on their X-ray profile.

== Stellar components ==
=== HD 92206AB ===
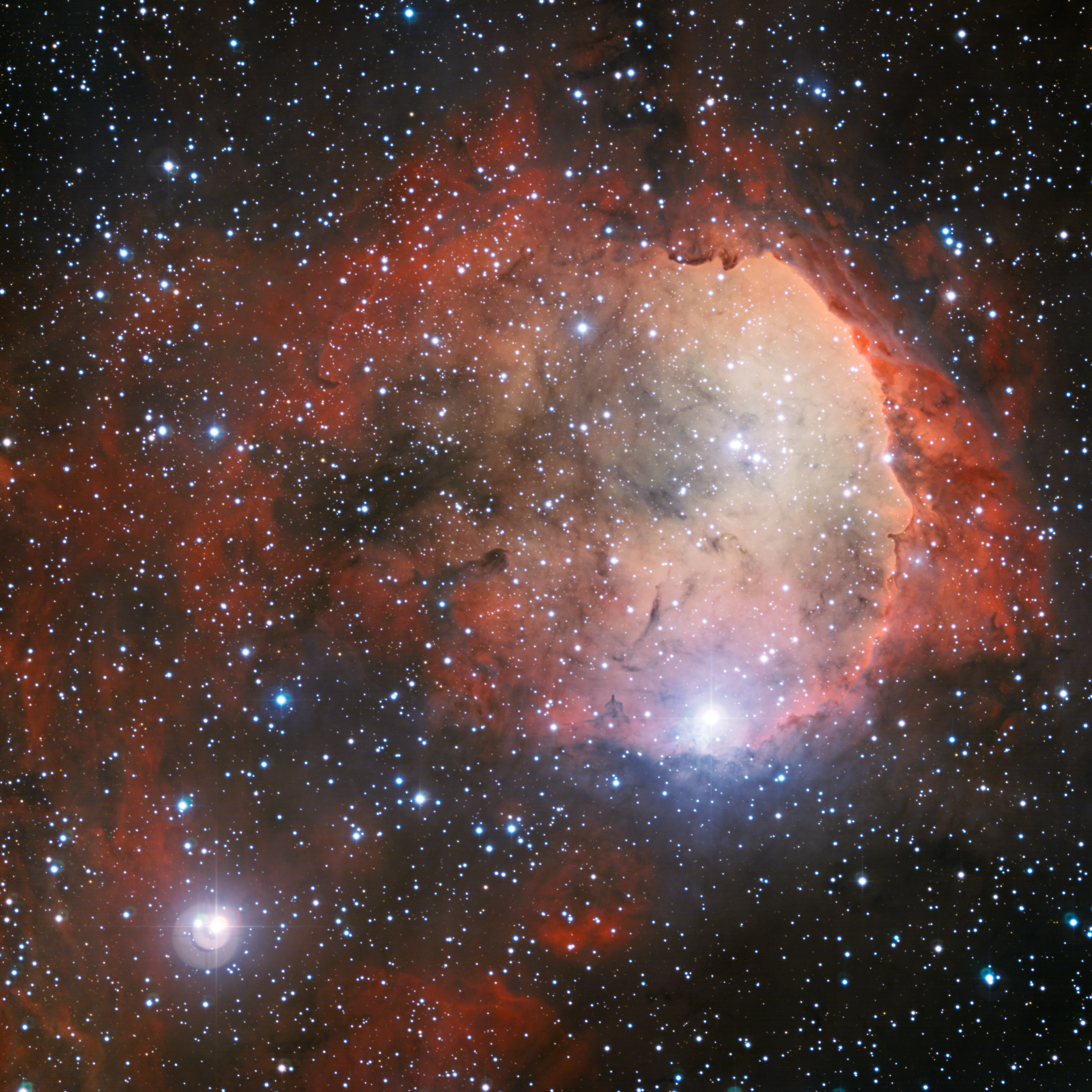
NGC 3324, with HD 92206 (circled) near the center of the arc of nebulosity.

HD 92206A and B comprise a wide binary system, separated by 5".4. They have both been given the spectral type of O6.5V, indicating they are both energetic O-type main-sequence stars each radiating a bolometric luminosity about 170,000 times the Sun's. Despite this, A appears almost a magnitude brighter than B, thus it has been suggested that A could be a spectroscopic binary between two similar O6.5V stars.

In 2014, an X-ray source, designated HD 92206A2, was identified just 0".83 (distance ~1900 AU) from A, which emits hard X-rays i.e., X-rays with a high photon energy at 5.17 keV (wavelength 0.240 nm), as opposed to the soft (low-energy) X-rays released by late O-type stars like A, B, and C. Unless it is highly reddened, this is thought to be a young (~1 Myr old) star with a mass of 0.5–1 M_{☉}, producing X-rays in its corona.

=== HD 92206C ===
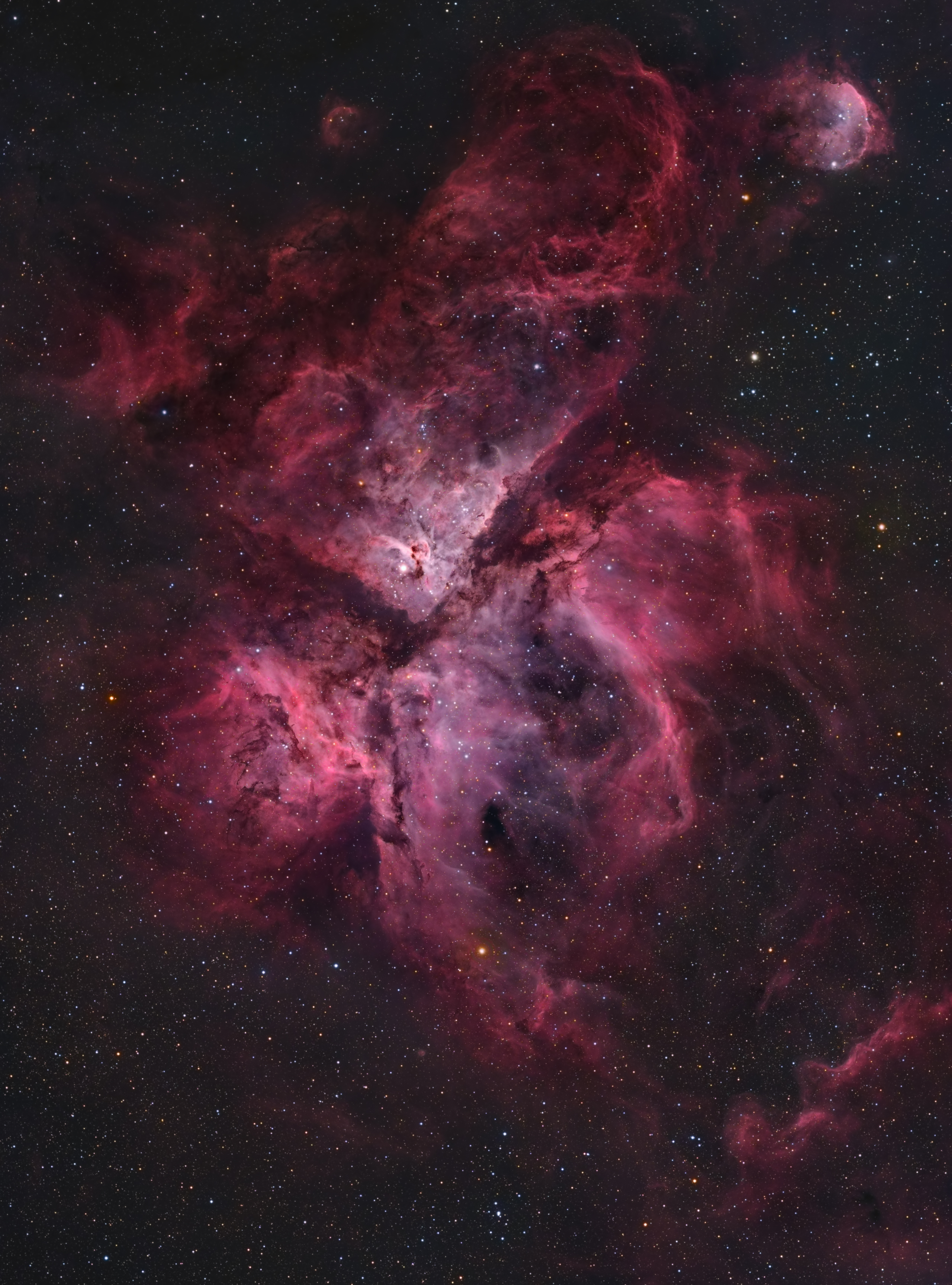
Carina Nebula with NGC 3324 and HD 92206 at top right

At a separation of 33" from the AB pair, HD 92206C (alternatively CPD−57° 3580) was first reported to be a spectroscopic binary in 2007, and was further resolved to be a triple system by 2017. Two stars with the spectral types O8V and O9.7V orbit each other with a period of 2.02 days, while a fainter B2-type star orbits them within 1 arcsecond of the inner pair. The brightest of the three has a luminosity 112,000 times that of the Sun (though this was derived from a spectral type of O7.5V rather than O8V). The spectrum of C shows very strong, broad hydrogen lines resembling that of θ^{1} Orionis C, characteristic of very young stars. The star (or at least one of its components) is known to have a magnetic field.

Simultaneously with the detection of HD 92206A2, another X-ray source, C2, was discovered 1".7 from C, but its closeness to the much brighter C prevented precise measurements. Due to its faintness, it is thought to be a late-type star.

== Formation ==
The location of the HD 92206 system is offset from the center of Gum 31, the nebula from which it formed. To explain this, it has been theorized that the stars were born as two molecular clouds with differing velocities collided at supersonic speeds about one million years ago, which carved a cavity into the center of the nebula and shaped a core that collapsed to form the massive stars.

== Bow shock ==
In 2005, a bow shock was discovered to surround the multiple system. It has a thickness of 98000±27000 km, extremely thin compared to the bow shocks around other stars reported in the same paper, which are tens or hundreds of AU thick. Due to its great distance from Earth, it has not been fully resolved.
