= HD 35619 =

Double star in the constellation Auriga

Observation data Epoch J2000 Equinox ICRS
- Constellation: Auriga
- Right ascension: 05^{h} 27^{m} 36.1469^{s}
- Declination: +34° 45′ 19.003″
- Apparent magnitude (V): 8.572

Characteristics
- Spectral type: O7.5V((f))z
- U−B color index: −0.701
- B−V color index: +0.242

Astrometry
Radial velocity (R_{v})	−1.5 km/s
Proper motion (μ)	RA: −0.596 mas/yr Dec.: −2.019 mas/yr
Parallax (π)	0.2716±0.0425 mas
Distance	approx. 12,000 ly (approx. 3,700 pc)

Details
Mass	9.9 M_{☉}
Radius	11.4 R_{☉}
Luminosity	547,500 L_{☉}
Surface gravity (log g)	2.58 cgs
Temperature	41,356 K
Metallicity [Fe/H]	0.02 dex
Rotational velocity (v sin i)	39 km/s

Other designations
- BD+34°1046, HD 35619, SAO 58048

Database references
SIMBAD	data

Data sources:

Hipparcos Catalogue, CCDM (2002), Bright Star Catalogue (5th rev. ed.)

HD 35619 is a double star in the northern constellation of Auriga. It has an apparent magnitude of 8.572, which is too faint to be viewed with the naked eye. The companion is 12th magnitude and 2 arc-seconds away.
