= GCIRS 8* =

Star in the constellation Sagittarius

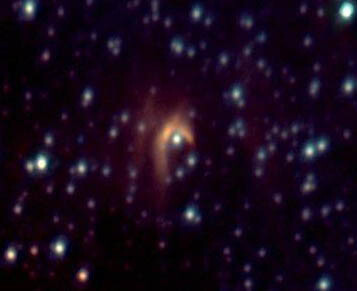
- The bow shock around IRS 8 imaged by the Gemini Observatory

Observation data Epoch J2000.0 Equinox J2000.0
- Constellation: Sagittarius
- Right ascension: 17^{h} 45^{m} 40.14^{s}
- Declination: −28° 59′ 58.7″

Characteristics
- Spectral type: O

Database references
| SIMBAD | data |

GCIRS 8* (Galactic Centre IRS 8*) is a young massive star in the Galactic Center region. IRS 8 is an infra-red source identified as a bowshock. The star causing the bowshock has been classified as an O5–O6 giant or supergiant several hundred thousand times as luminous as the sun. It is estimated to be 3.5 million years old, although if it is a binary then it would probably be older. The mass is estimated at 38 M_{☉}.
