= BI 253 =

O-type main sequence star in the constellation Dorado

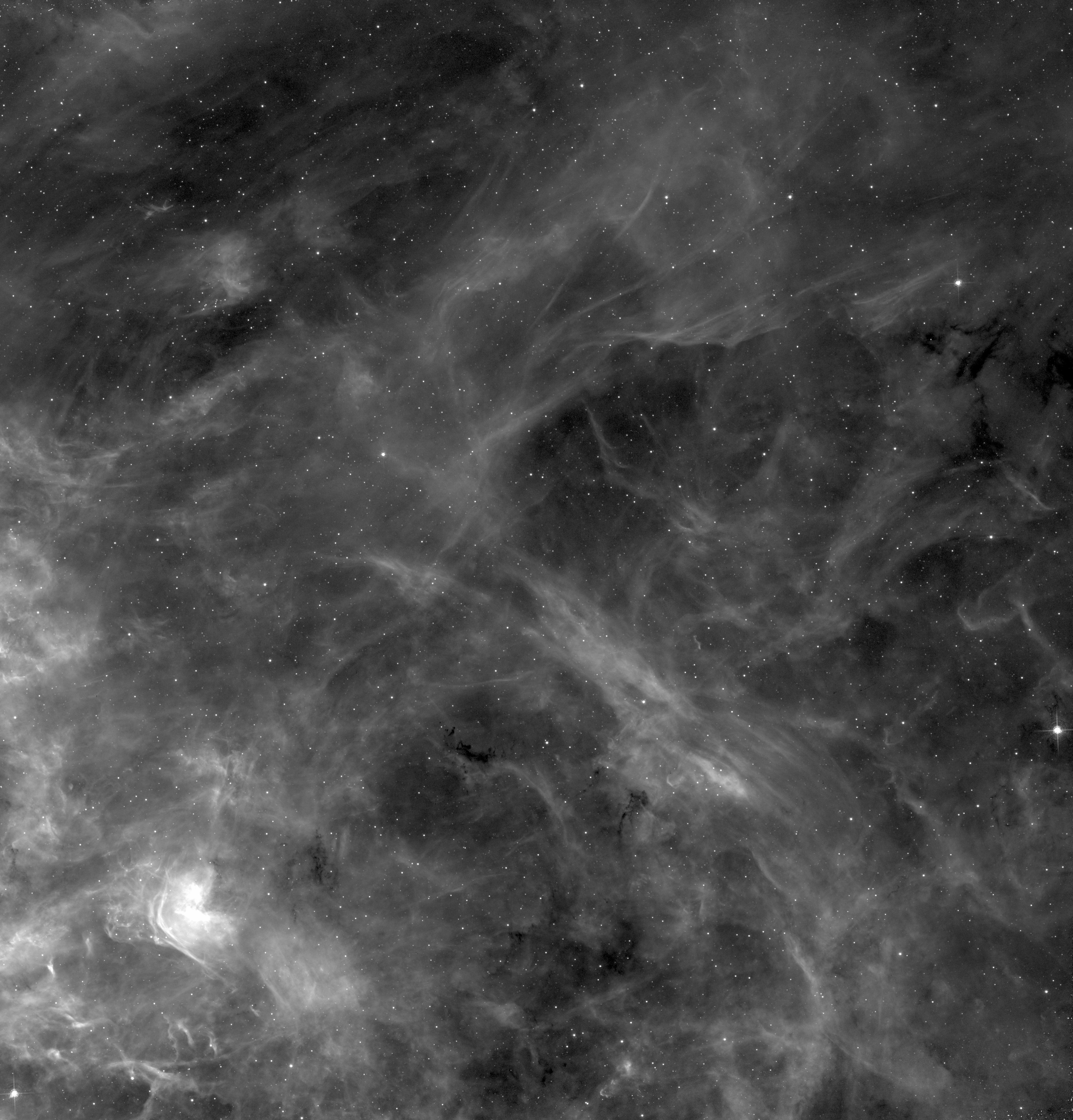
- NW portion of the Tarantula Nebula, with BI 253 towards the top right Credit: Hubble Legacy Archive

Observation data Epoch J2000 Equinox ICRS
- Constellation: Dorado
- Right ascension: 05^{h} 37^{m} 34.461^{s}
- Declination: −69° 01′ 10.20″
- Apparent magnitude (V): 13.76

Characteristics
- Evolutionary stage: Main sequence
- Spectral type: O2V-III(n)((f^{*}))
- U−B color index: −1.02
- B−V color index: −0.13

Astrometry
Proper motion (μ)	RA: 2.3 mas/yr Dec.: 3.1 mas/yr
Distance	164,000 ly (50,000 pc)
Absolute magnitude (M_{V})	−5.7

Details
Mass	97.6 M_{☉}
Radius	10.9+1.7 −1.6 R_{☉}
Luminosity	1,200,000+210,000 −370,000 L_{☉}
Surface gravity (log g)	4.36+0.12 −0.33 cgs
Temperature	58,000+1,600 −5,500 K
Rotational velocity (v sin i)	153±24 km/s
Age	0.4+0.8 −0.4 Myr

Other designations
- BI 253, VFTS 72, 2MASS J05373446-6901102, IRSF J05373446-6901102

Database references
SIMBAD	data

BI 253 is an O2V star in the Large Magellanic Cloud and is a primary standard of the O2 type. It is one of the hottest main-sequence stars known and one of the most-massive and most-luminous stars known.

== Discovery ==
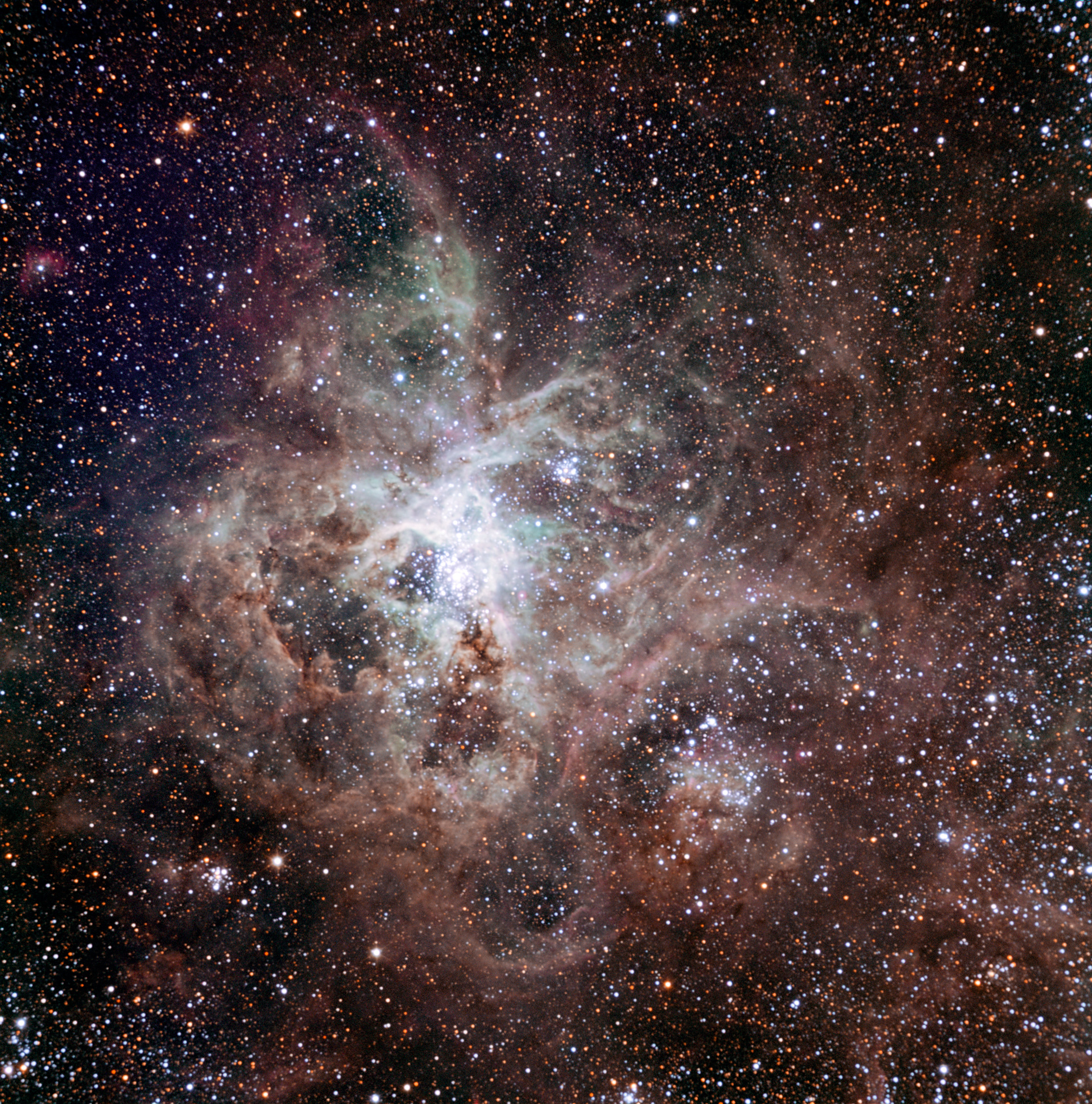
Tarantula Nebula with BI 253 towards top right (TRAPPIST/E. Jehin/ESO)

BI 253 was first catalogued in 1975 as the 253rd of 272 likely O and early B stars in the Large Magellanic Cloud. In 1995, the spectral type was analysed to be O3 V, the earliest type defined at that time.

When the classification of the earliest type O stars was refined in 2002, the complete lack of neutral helium or doubly ionised nitrogen lines in the spectrum led to BI 253 being placed in a new O2 V class. It was given a ((f^{*})) qualifier because of the very weak emission lines of helium and nitrogen. The most recent published data gives a spectral type of O2V-III(n)((f^{*})), although it is unclear whether this is due to higher quality spectra or an actual change in the spectrum.

BI 253 has been identified as a runaway star because of its relatively isolated position outside the main star-forming areas of 30 Doradus, and because of its high space velocity. It was potentially ejected from the R136 cluster about a million years ago.

== Properties ==
BI 253 is one of the hottest, most massive, and most luminous known main sequence stars. The temperature is around 54,000 K, the luminosity over a million L_{☉}, and the mass of nearly 100 M_{☉}, although its radius is less than 14 R_{☉}. The rotation rate of around 185 km/s is high, but this is common in the youngest and hottest stars, either due to spin-up during stellar formation or merger of a close binary system.

== Evolution ==
BI 253 is still burning hydrogen in its core, but shows enrichment of nitrogen and helium at the surface due to strong rotational and convectional mixing and because of its strong stellar wind. It is very close to the expected ZAMS position for an 85 M_{☉} star. It is expected that stars more massive than BI 253 would show a giant or supergiant luminosity class even on the main sequence.
