= IC 418 =

Planetary nebula in the constellation Lepus

Emission nebula
- Planetary nebula
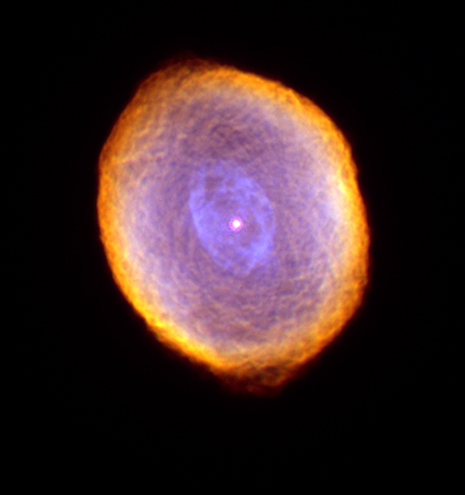
- A false color image of IC 418 (the spirograph nebula).

Observation data: J2000 epoch
- Right ascension: 05^{h} 27^{m} 28.2037^{s}
- Declination: −12° 41′ 50.265″
- Distance: 3.6 ± 1.0 kly (1100 ± 300 pc) ly
- Apparent magnitude (V): 9.6
- Apparent dimensions (V): 3.5″ x 5.5″ / 11″ x 14″ / 150″ / 220″ x 250″
- Constellation: Lepus

Physical characteristics
- Radius: 0.15 ly
- Absolute magnitude (V): -
- Notable features: -
- Designations: Spirograph Nebula

IC 418, also known as the Spirograph Nebula, Raspberry Nebula, or Colored Contacts Nebula, is a bright planetary nebula located in the constellation of Lepus about 3,600 ly away from Earth. It spans 0.3 light-years across. The central star of the planetary nebula, HD 35914, is an O-type star with a spectral type of O7fp. The nebula formed a few thousand years ago during the star's last stages of its red giant phase. Material from the star's outer layers was ejected from the star into the surrounding space. The nebula's glow is caused by the central star's ultraviolet radiation interacting with the gas.

== Composition ==
The nebula gets its colors from the different chemical elements inside the nebula. The red color is nitrogen (the coldest gas in the nebula), the green is hydrogen and the traces of blue are the ionized oxygen gas (the hottest gas in the nebula due to its proximity to the central star).

The neutral regions of IC 418 contains lots of large grains of amorphous carbon while the ionized regions of the nebula contain smaller graphite grains. There is also likely the presence of silicon carbide, magnesium and iron sulfides. The presence of theses chemicals would explain the emission features seen in IC 418.

== Structure ==
IC 418 shows a multi-shelled structure with the main nebula slightly off centered to the outer elliptical halo. The nebula also contains numerous radial filaments, rays, a system of three concentric rings with time lapse between the rings being ~630 years. There are also two detached haloes with time lapse between the two haloes is around 10,000–50,000 years. There is also the presence of little blisters or ‘bubble-like’ features on to the exterior walls of the nebular shell.

Extinction maps show that extinction tends to be higher at or close to the rim of the nebula.

=== Inner shell ===
The inner shell of IC 418 is particularly bright that higher relative excitation which is common for the inner shell of planetary nebulas. The inner shell overplotted with the two slits going across the central star. The velocity of the gas at the poles has been determined to be traveling at 15.7 km/s while the equatorial gas travels at 12.6 km/s. These speeds only apply to the outer skirts of the inner shell.

=== Radial filaments and rays ===
The nebula contains numerous low surface brightness radial filaments and rays that emanate from the bright shell of IC 418. The filaments are mostly radial pointing towards the location of the central star. They are relatively featureless and broad. The separation of the rings are not uniform.

=== Halos ===
IC 418 contains halos, the inner halo and the outer halo. The time lapse between the two haloes is around 10,000–50,000 years. The faint inner halo is ionized but much is unclear about this halo. The outer halo is elliptical and five times fainter than the inner halo. It has a notable limb-brightened morphology, and its western tip is brighter than the eastern tip. Information on the kinematics of the halos is not available because the low surface brightness.

== Naming ==
The name derives from the intricate pattern of the nebula, which resembles a pattern which can be created using the Spirograph, a toy that produces geometric patterns (specifically, hypotrochoids and epitrochoids) on paper. The origin of the Spirograph pattern is unknown.
