= HD 108 =

Peculiar star in the constellation Cassiopeia

Observation data Epoch J2000.0 Equinox ICRS
- Constellation: Cassiopeia
- Right ascension: 00^{h} 06^{m} 03.389^{s}
- Declination: +63° 40′ 46.77″
- Apparent magnitude (V): 7.40

Characteristics
- Spectral type: O4–8f?p
- U−B color index: −0.61
- B−V color index: 0.18

Astrometry
Radial velocity (R_{v})	−63.3±0.3 km/s
Proper motion (μ)	RA: −4.284 mas/yr Dec.: −1.992 mas/yr
Parallax (π)	0.4980±0.0240 mas
Distance	6,230 ± 360 ly (1,910±110 pc)

Details
Mass	42±5 M_{☉}
Radius	19.4±1.5 R_{☉}
Luminosity	5.0+1.3 −1.0×10^{5} L_{☉}
Surface gravity (log g)	3.50±0.10 cgs
Temperature	35,000±2,000 K
Rotation	55 years
Age	3.3±0.3 Myr

Other designations
- NSV 25, AAVSO 0000+63, BD+62°2363, GC 85, HD 108, HIP 505, SAO 10973, WDS J00061+6341AB

Database references
SIMBAD	data

HD 108 is a massive, peculiar star in the northern circumpolar constellation of Cassiopeia. At an apparent visual magnitude of 7.40, it is too faint to be visible to the naked eye. HD 108 is located at an estimated distance of 6,230 ± 360 light-years (1.91 ± 0.11 kpc) from the Sun, but is drifting closer with a line of sight velocity of −63 km/s. Based on its proper motion, it is a likely member of the Cas OB5 association of co-moving stars.

This is a massive O-type star with a stellar classification of O4–8f?p. It has around 42 times the mass of the Sun and 19 times the Sun's radius. The star is radiating 500,000 times the luminosity of the Sun from its photosphere at an effective temperature of 35,000 K. In 2023, long-term monitoring of radial velocity suggested an orbiting companion with a period of 8.5 years and a mass of at least 4 M_{☉}.

== Observations ==
This star was discovered to have strong H-alpha emission lines in 1925, suggesting it is a Be star with a stellar classification of O6e. In 1940, the spectrum of this star was found to have changed significantly. It was noted as belonging to a set of peculiar stars of class 'Of', based on certain He II and N III emission lines at wavelengths of 4634, 4640, and 4686 Å. The spectrum displayed evidence of mass loss from a high velocity stellar wind. In addition to the Of emission lines, HD 108 shows unusual C III emission lines around 4650 Å with a comparable strength to the nearby N III lines. In 1971, N. Walborn introduced the Of?p category to classify the spectrum of this star and HD 148937.

In 1974, radial velocity measurements of singly-ionized helium lines from this star showed a periodicity of 4.612 days, suggesting the presence of an unseen closely orbiting companion. This object appeared to be orbiting with an eccentricity of 0.44. The isolated location of this star in the sky indicated this is a high velocity runaway star system. The ejection of this system from a young open cluster of stars is difficult to explain through many-body interactions, and may instead be the result of a Type II supernova explosion. This indicates the hypothetical companion could be a collapsed supernova remnant; either a neutron star or a stellar mass black hole.

Measurement of the infrared excess and wind velocity in 1981 indicated a mass loss rate of 5×10^{−5} M_{☉}·yr^{−1}. This is one of the highest rates found for O-type stars and is more in line with a Wolf-Rayet star. Radiation pressure alone is insufficient to explain this rate. Ultraviolet measurement of the spectrum demonstrated variations in wind velocity of 40 km/s and the changes did not support a binary system.

A polarimetric study of the star in 1994 showed random variability but with systematic nightly changes. The data proved similar to that observed for single OB supergiants and Wolf-Rayet stars. It may be explained by random ejection of plasma blobs in the stellar wind, or by an equatorial disk combined with jets at the poles. This star maintained a steady brightness from 1988 until 1994, then it began a monotonic decline. It showed a decrease of 0.06 in magnitude by 1999. Emission lines reached a minimum strength during 2007–2008, then began to increase.

In 2001, a study of 30 years of spectroscopic observations of HD 108 failed to detect any periodicity that would support the presence of a companion. X-ray observations with the XMM-Newton space observatory showed that the emission is very stable over long periods. This is in contrast to the optical spectrum which shows significant line variations on timescales of decades. The X-ray luminosity for this star is too low for it to be considered an X-ray binary.

The detection of a dipole magnetic field around HD 108 was announced in 2010. The longitudinal magnetic field has a measured strength of −168±35 Gauss. The detection of Zeeman features in certain spectral lines suggested the presence of material around the star. The stable nature of the magnetic field indicated a very low rotation rate of 55 years. This would require a spin-down period of 8.5 Myr, which is much longer than the star's estimated age of 3.3 Myr. To explain this, the average magnetic field needs to be twice as strong as measured.

== See also ==
- HD 191612 – a system that displays similar behavior
