= List of most luminous stars =

Stars sorted by absolute magnitude

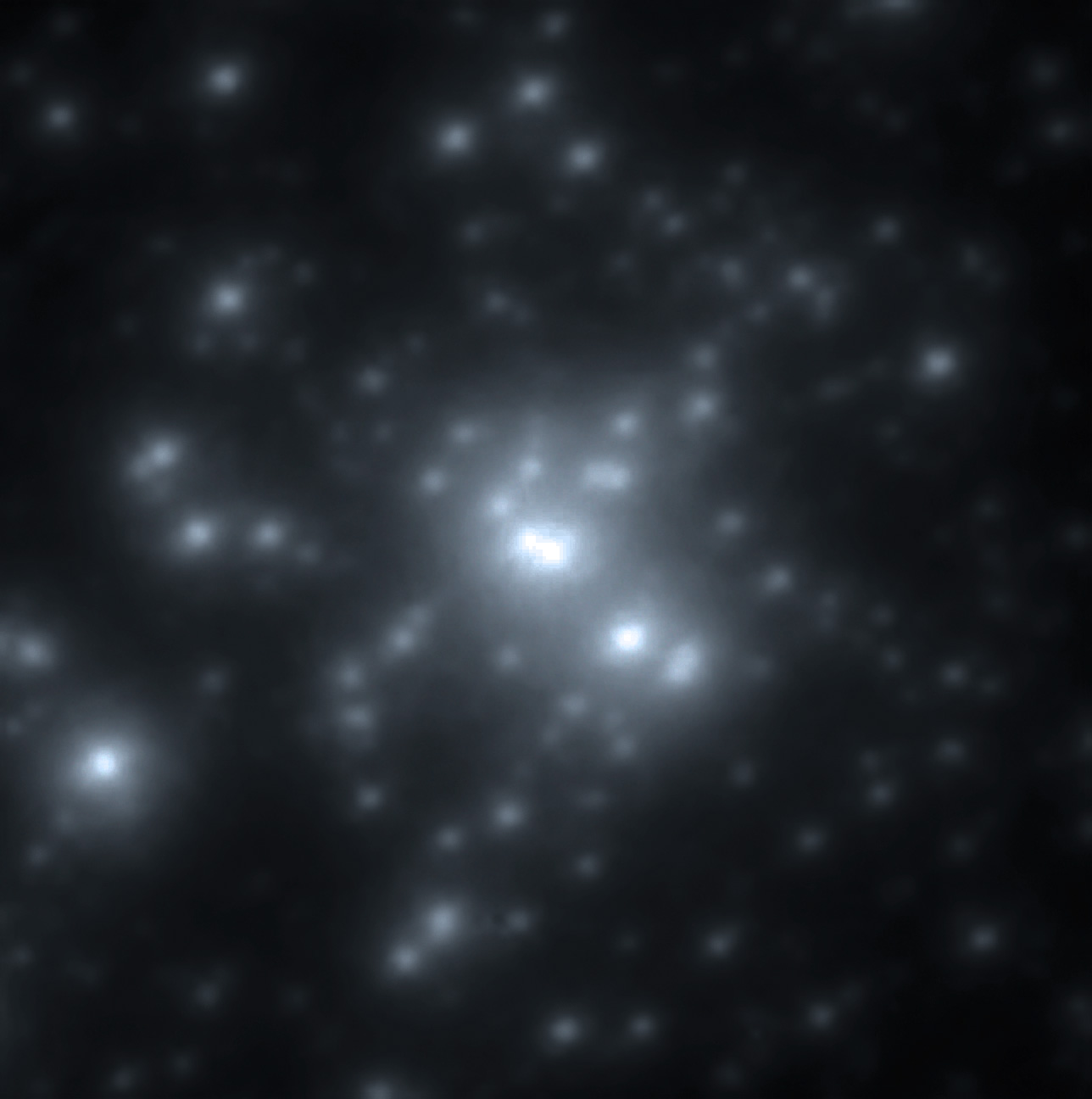
A near-infrared image of the R136 cluster. This cluster contains many of the most luminous known stars, including R136a1. Credit: ESO/VLT

This is a list of stars arranged by their absolute magnitude – their intrinsic stellar luminosity. This cannot be observed directly, so instead must be calculated from the apparent magnitude (the brightness as seen from Earth), the distance to each star, and a correction for interstellar extinction. The entries in the list below are further corrected to provide the bolometric magnitude, i.e., integrated over all wavelengths; this relies upon measurements in multiple photometric filters and extrapolation of the stellar spectrum based on the stellar spectral type and/or effective temperature.

Entries give the bolometric luminosity in multiples of the luminosity of the Sun (L_{☉}) and the bolometric absolute magnitude. As with all magnitude systems in astronomy, the latter scale is logarithmic and inverted i.e., more negative numbers are more luminous.

Most stars on this list are not bright enough to be visible to the naked eye from Earth, because of their high distances, high extinction, or because they emit most of their light outside the visible range. For a list of the brightest stars seen from Earth, see the list of brightest stars. There are three stars with over 1 million L_{☉} and visible to the naked eye: WR 22, WR 24 and Eta Carinae. All of these stars are located in the Carina nebula.

== Measurement ==
Accurate measurement of stellar luminosities is difficult, even when the apparent magnitude is measured accurately, for four reasons:

1. The distance d to the star must be known, to convert apparent to absolute magnitude. Absolute magnitude is the apparent magnitude a star would have if it were 10 parsecs (~32 light years) away from the viewer. Because apparent brightness decreases as the square of the distance (i.e., as 1/d^{2}), a small error (e.g. 10%) in determining d implies an error ~2× as large (thus 20%) in luminosity (see binomial approximation). Stellar distances are only directly measured accurately out to d ~1,000 light years.
2. The observed magnitudes must be corrected for the absorption or extinction of intervening interstellar or circumstellar dust and gas. This correction can be enormous and difficult to determine precisely. For example, until accurate infrared observations became possible ~50 years ago, the Galactic Center of the Milky Way was totally obscured to visual observations.
3. The magnitudes at the wavelengths measured must be corrected for those not observed. "Absolute bolometric magnitude" (which term is redundant, practically speaking, since bolometric magnitudes are nearly always "absolute", i.e., corrected for distance) is a measure of the star's luminosity, summing over its emission at all wavelengths, and thus the total amount of energy radiated by a star every second. Bolometric magnitudes can only be estimated by correcting for unobserved portions of the spectrum that have to be modelled, which is always an issue, and often a large correction. The list is dominated by hot blue stars which produce the majority of their energy output in the ultraviolet, but these may not necessarily be the brightest stars at visual wavelengths.
4. A large proportion of stellar systems discovered with very high luminosity have later been found to be binary. Usually, this results in the total system luminosity being reduced and spread among several components. These binaries are common both because the conditions that produce high mass high luminosity stars also favour multiple star systems, but also because searches for highly luminous stars are inevitably biased towards detecting systems with multiple more normal stars combining to appear luminous.

Because of all these problems, other references may give very different values for the most luminous stars (different ordering or different stars altogether). Data on different stars can be of somewhat different reliability, depending on the attention one particular star has received as well as largely differing physical difficulties in analysis (see the Pistol Star for an example). The last stars in the list are familiar nearby stars put there for comparison, and not among the most luminous known. It may also interest the reader to know that the Sun is more luminous than approximately 95% of all known stars in the local neighbourhood (out to, say, a few hundred light years), due to enormous numbers of somewhat less massive stars that are cooler and often much less luminous. For perspective, the overall range of stellar luminosities runs from dwarfs less than 1/10,000th as luminous as the Sun to supergiants over 1,000,000 times more luminous.

== List ==
Legend
Wolf–Rayet star
Luminous blue variable/Slash star
O-type star
B-type star
A-type star
F-type star
G-type star
K-type star
M-type star

This list is currently limited mostly to objects in our galaxy and the Magellanic Clouds, but a few stars in other local group galaxies can now be examined in enough detail to determine their luminosities. Some suspected binaries in this magnitude range are excluded because there is insufficient information about the luminosity of the individual components. Selected fainter stars are also shown for comparison. Despite their extreme luminosity, many of these stars are nevertheless too distant to be observed with the naked eye. Stars that are at least sometimes visible to the unaided eye have their apparent magnitude (6.5 or brighter) highlighted in blue.

Thanks to gravitational lensing, stars that are strongly magnified can be seen at much larger distances. If Godzilla — a LBV candidate in the distant Sunburst galaxy — is a single star, it is probably the brightest star ever observed, albeit undergoing a temporary episode of increased luminosity that has lasted at least seven years, in a similar manner to the Great Eruption of Eta Carinae that was witnessed in the 19th century. It may instead be a star cluster.

The first list shows a few of the known stars with an estimated luminosity of 1 million L_{☉} or greater, including the stars in open clusters, OB associations and H II regions. The majority of stars thought to be more than 1 million L_{☉} are shown, but the list is incomplete.

The second list gives some notable stars for the purpose of comparison.

Stars with 1 million L_{☉} or greater
Star name	Location	L (L_{☉})	M_{bol}	Dist. (ly)	m_{V}	T_{eff} (K)	Spectral type	Link	Refs.
R136a1	R136	7,240,000+700,000 −1,080,000	-12.41	163,000	12.28	46,000+1,250 −2,375	WN5h	SIMBAD	
η Twin-1	M51	6,950,000 – 7,762,000	-12.36 or -12.48	23,500,000	23.64	27,610 - 37,740	LBV		
R136a2	R136	5,130,000+370,000 −340,000	-12.035	163,000	12.34	47,000+1,000 −625	WN5h	SIMBAD	
BAT99-98	NGC 2070	5,012,000	-12.01	165,000	13.38	45,000	WN6	SIMBAD	
G0.238-0.071 (in Galactic Center)		5,012,000	-12.01	26,000	14.37 (J band)	39,500-44,000	WN11h	SIMBAD	
SN 2005gl progenitor	NGC 266	5,012,000	-12.01	215,000,000	24.1	20,000	LBV?		
R136a3	R136	5,010,000+240,000 −230,000	-12.01	163,000	12.97	50,000+2,500 −8,000	WN5h	SIMBAD	
SN 1961V progenitor	NGC 1058	4,965,000	-12	30,000,000	~18	≥45,000	LBV		
M33-013406.63 A	Triangulum Galaxy	4,677,000	-11.935	3,000,000	16.084 (combined)	30,000	O9.5Ia	SIMBAD	(Note: M33-013406.63, also called LGGS J013406.63+304147.8, was thought of as a star with over 8 million luminosity in the past, but a new reference indicated that M33-013406.63 may be a binary, the primary will be reduced to about 4.5 million luminosity.)
Westerhout 49-2	W49 South	4,365,000+3,397,000 −1,910,000	-11.86	36,200	18.246 (J band)	35,500+1,700 −1,600	O2-3.5If*	SIMBAD	
HD 37836	LMC	4,169,000	-11.81	163,000	10.55	28,200	B0Iae	SIMBAD	
Sk -69° 249 A	NGC 2074	4,130,000	-11.8	160,000	10.68	38,900	O7If	SIMBAD	
η Carinae A	Trumpler 16	4,000,000	-11.77	7,800	3.8 (combined)	9,400–35,200	LBV	SIMBAD	(Note: Identified as a binary system, or possibly three stars. But the secondary is almost completely swamped by the primary.)
V4998 Sagittarii	near Quintuplet Cluster	4,000,000	-11.77	25,000	12.534 (J band)	12,000	LBV	SIMBAD	
R136c	R136	3,802,000+1,568,000 −1,110,000	-11.71	163,000	13.43	42,170±1,890	WN5h	SIMBAD	
Melnick 42	R136	3,631,000	-11.66	163,000	12.78	47,300	O2If*	SIMBAD	
WR 125–3	Mercer 23	3,631,000	-11.66	21,200	8.646 (J band)	38,000	WNL7-8	SIMBAD	(Note: Mercer 23 is an open cluster near Galactic plane.)
η Twin-2	M101	3,581,000 – 3,741,000	-11.65 or -11.69	21,600,000	23.92	50,120	LBV		
ηTwin-4	M83	3,500,000 – 3,589,000	-11.62 or -11.65	14,700,000	23.31 (B band)	50,100	LBV		
NGC 2403 V14	NGC 2403	3,436,000	-11.6	10,314,000	18.83	7,000	F5Ie	SIMBAD	
HD 80077	Pismis 11	3388000+2366000 −1393000	-11.57	10,437	9.0	17,700	B2Ia+e		
WR 102ka	near Galactic Center	3,311,000	-11.56	26,000	12.978 (J band)	25,000	WN10	SIMBAD	
G0.070+0.025 (in Galactic Center)		3,311,000	-11.56	26,000	14.799 (J band)	45,000	O4-6If+	SIMBAD	
Mercer 30-1 A	Mercer 30	3,236,000	-11.535	40,000	10.33 (J band)	32,200	O6-7.5If+	SIMBAD	(Note: Mercer 30 is an open cluster in Dragonfish Nebula.)
VFTS 682	Runaway from R136	3,236,000+838,000 −666,000	-11.535	164,000	16.08	54,450±1,960	WN5h	SIMBAD	
WR 42e	Runaway from HD 97950	3,200,000	-11.523	25,000	14.53	43,700	O3If*/WN6	SIMBAD	(Note: The paper mistakenly lists the bolometric magnitude as -10.5 instead of -11.5.)
R99	LH 49	3,162,000	-11.51	163,000	11.52	28,000	Ofpe/WN9	SIMBAD	
NGC 4736-1	Cat's Eye Galaxy	3,162,000	-11.51	16,000,000	19.31	18,000	LBV	SIMBAD	
VFTS 1022	R136	3,020,000+782,000 −621,000	-11.46	164,000	13.47	42,170±1,520	O3.5If*/WN7	SIMBAD	
WR 24	Collinder 228	2,951,000	-11.435	8,200	6.48	50,100	WN6ha-w	SIMBAD	
CXOGC J174528.6-285605 (WR 101–6 in Galactic Center)		2,884,000	-11.41	26,000	14.46 (J band)	30,000	WN8-9h	SIMBAD	
G0.059-0.068 (in Galactic Center)		2,884,000	-11.41	26,000	13.337 (J band)	39,500-44,000	B0-1Ia+/WNLh	SIMBAD	
HD 97950 B	HD 97950	2,884,000+504,000 −429,000	-11.41	24,000	11.33	42,000±2,000	WN6h	SIMBAD	
Wray 17-96	near Galactic Center	2,818,000	-11.385	15,000	15	20,000	B[e]:	SIMBAD	(Note: Strictly speaking, MSX5C G358.5391+00.1305 is the name of the star, Wray 17-96 is the name its surrounding nebula.)
ηTwin-5	M83	2,812,000 – 3,192,000	-11.38 or -11.52	14,700,000	22.83 (B band)	50,100	LBV		
Sk -69° 212	NGC 2044	2,754,000+1,414,000 −1,683,000	-11.35	160,000	12.416	52,900+5,900 −16,000	O4.5If	SIMBAD	
HD 38282 A	Runaway from R136	2,754,000+336,000 −300,000	-11.35	163,000	11.11 (combined)	50,000±2,000	WN5/6h	SIMBAD	
Melnick 34 A	R136	2,692,000+544,000 −453,000	-11.335	163,000	13.09 (combined)	53,000±1,200	WN5h	SIMBAD	
VFTS 506	NGC 2070	2,692,000	-11.335	164,000	13.31	55,000	ON2V((n))((f*))	SIMBAD	
WR 102hb	Quintuplet cluster	2,630,000	-11.31	26,000	13.9 (J band)	25,100	WN10h	SIMBAD	
[BMS2003] 578 C (in NGC 604 of Triangulum Galaxy)		2,564,000	-11.28	2,700,000	15.97 (combined)	34,000	O9II	SIMBAD	
HD 269810	NGC 2029	2,455,000+497,000 −717,000	-11.235	163,000	12.28	57,200+2,000 −5,100	O2III(f*)	SIMBAD	
WR 102ea	Quintuplet cluster	2,455,000	-11.235	26,000	13.18 (J band)	25,100	WN9h	SIMBAD	
HD 38282 B	Runaway from R136	2,455,000+300,000 −267,000	-11.235	163,000	11.11 (combined)	45,000±2,000	WN6/7h	SIMBAD	
CXOGC J174516.1-284909 (WR 101–2 in Galactic Center)		2,399,000	-11.21	26,000	11.49 (J band)	20,000	Ofpe/WN9	SIMBAD	
CXOGC J174711.4-283006 (WR 102–9 in Galactic Center)		2,399,000	-11.21	26,000	16.56 (J band)	30,000	WN8-9h	SIMBAD	
WR 25 A	Trumpler 16	2,399,000	-11.21	6,800	8.8 (combined)	50,100	WN6h-w	SIMBAD	(Note: This is a binary system but the secondary is much less luminous than the primary.)
LGGS J004444.52+412804.0	Andromeda Galaxy	2,377,000+481,000 −400,000	-11.2	2,500,000	18.1	18,000±2,000	F0Ia	SIMBAD	
HD 269327	LMC	2,377,000	-11.2	163,000	10.74	28,200	B0:	SIMBAD	
Melnick 34 B	R136	2,344,000+474,000 −394,000	-11.185	163,000	13.09 (combined)	53,000±1,200	WN5h	SIMBAD	
WR 62–2	VVV CL041	2,344,000	-11.185	13,700	10.146 (J band)	34,000	WN8-9h	SIMBAD	(Note: VVV CL041 is an open cluster.)
LH 10-3209 A	NGC 1763	2,312,000	-11.17	160,000	12.73	50,900	O3III(f*)	SIMBAD	
Cl 1813-178 #16	Cl 1813-178	2,291,000+660,000 −553,000	-11.16	15,300	9.428 (J band)	30,200±700	O8-O9If	SIMBAD	(Note: Cl 1813-178 is an open cluster in the molecular cloud complex W33 Complex.)
R147	Runaway from R136	2,291,000+593,000 −471,000	-11.16	164,000	13.02	47,320±1,700	WN5h	SIMBAD	
R136a7	R136	2,291,000+280,000 −341,000	-11.16	163,000	13.97	54,000+2,000 −3,000	O3III(f*)	SIMBAD	
VVV CL074-12	VVV CL074	2,291,000+2,280,000 −1,143,000	-11.16	20,000	12.34 (J band)	22,500±4,000	B0.5-2I	SIMBAD	(Note: VVV CL074 is an open cluster.)
Arches-F9	Arches Cluster	2,239,000	-11.135	25,000	16.1 (J band)	36,600	WN8–9h	SIMBAD	
HD 5980 A	NGC 346	2,239,000+580,000 −460,000	-11.135	200,000	11.31 (combined)	45,000±5,000	WN6h	SIMBAD	(Note: Variable, luminosity was five times higher at outburst in 1994.)
HD 97950 C1	HD 97950	2,239,000+392,000 −333,000	-11.135	24,000	11.89 (combined)	44,000±2,000	WN6h	SIMBAD	
R136b	R136	2,239,000+160,000 −149,000	-11.135	165,000	13.24	35,500±750	O4If	SIMBAD	
R145 A	Tarantula Nebula	2,239,000+924,000 −654,000	-11.135	163,000	12.04 (combined)	50,000±3,000	WN6h	SIMBAD	
Var 83 (in Triangulum Galaxy)		2,239,000	-11.135	3,000,000	16.027	18,000-37,000	LBV	SIMBAD	
BI 265	LMC N160	2,188,000+1,981,000 −957,000	-11.11	163,000	12.38	49,800+9,800 −8,200	O5III(fc)	SIMBAD	
CXOGC J174712.2-283121 (WR 102–10 in Galactic Center)		2,188,000	-11.11	26,000	17.06 (J band)	35,000	WN7-8h	SIMBAD	
HD 268804 (in LMC)		2,148,000	-11.09	163,000	11.21	28,200	OB	SIMBAD	
G0.058+0.014 (in Galactic Center)		2,138,000	-11.085	26,000	14.704 (J band)	45,000	O4-6If+	SIMBAD	
LGGS J013508.78+303639.9 (in Triangulum Galaxy)		2,138,000	-11.085	2,834,000	14.00	7,464	A9Ia	SIMBAD	
R145 B	Tarantula Nebula	2,138,000+882,000 −624,000	-11.085	163,000	12.04 (combined)	43,000±3,000	O3.5If*/WN7	SIMBAD	
WR 89	HM 1	2,138,000	-11.085	9,500	11.02	39,800	WN8h	SIMBAD	
Arches-F6	Arches Cluster	2,089,000+255,000 −227,000	-11.06	25,000	15.75 (J band)	33,300±1,300	WN8-9ha	SIMBAD	
R136a5	R136	2,089,000+149,000 −139,000	-11.06	163,000	13.71	48,000±750	O2I(n)f*	SIMBAD	
BD+43° 3654	Runaway from Cygnus OB2	2,030,000±210,000	-11.029	5,400	10.06	46,800±900	O6If+	SIMBAD	
AFGL 2298 (near Galactic plane)		2,000,000	-11.013	33,000	12.164 (J band)	15,500-26,000	B8I	SIMBAD	(Note: Luminous blue variable, peak luminosity shown.)
Arches-F1	Arches Cluster	1,995,000	-11.01	25,000	16.3 (J band)	33,200	WN8-9h	SIMBAD	
Arches-F4	Arches Cluster	1,995,000	-11.01	25,000	15.63 (J band)	36,800	WN7-8h	SIMBAD	
M33C-15731 (in Triangulum Galaxy)		1,995,000	-11.01	2,834,000	16.819 (V band)	20,000	LBV	SIMBAD	
CXOGC J174656.3-283232 (WR 102–8 in Galactic Center)		1,995,000	-11.01	26,000	16.74 (J band)	30,000	WN8-9h	SIMBAD	
LBV 1806-20	1806−20 cluster	1,995,000	-11.01	28,000	13.66 (J band)	18,000–32,000	O9-B2	SIMBAD	(Note: G10.0-0.3 is a radio nebula in Galactic Center.)
Mercer 81-2 (WR 76–7 in Mercer 81 of G338.4+0.2)		1,995,000	-11.01	35,900	13.25 (J band)	36,000	WN7-8	SIMBAD	(Note: Mercer 81 is an open cluster in the molecular cloud G338.4+0.2.)
VFTS 545	R136	1,995,000+516,000 −410,000	-11.01	164,000	13.32	47,320±1,700	O2If*/WN5	SIMBAD	
WR 147S	Cygnus OB2	1,995,000	-11.01	5,800	13.86	39,800	WN8h	SIMBAD	
10584-9-1 (in Messier 81)		1,977,000	-11.0	11,842,000	19.1	18,000	sgB[e]	SIMBAD	
2MASS J04542610-6911022	LMC N83B	1,959,000	-10.99	163,000	12.68	37,200	O7V	SIMBAD	
R146	Runaway from R136	1,950,000+505,000 −401,000	-10.985	164,000	13.11	53,090±1,910	WN5ha	SIMBAD	
DBSB 179-15 (WR 84–6 in DBSB 179 of G347.6+0.2)		1,950,000	-10.985	25,800	12.5 (J band)	37,000	WN8-9h	SIMBAD	(Note: DBSB 179 is an open cluster in the molecular cloud G347.6+0.2.)
G0.114+0.021 (WR 102–12 in Galactic Center)		1,950,000	-10.985	26,000	16.672 (J band)	40,000	WN8-9h	SIMBAD	
R136a4	R136	1,905,000+90,000 −207,000	-10.96	163,000	13.41	50,000+500 −2,000	O3V((f*))(n)	SIMBAD	
Westerhout 49-1	W49 cluster 1	1,905,000+786,000 −556,000	-10.96	36,200	15.531 (J band)	44,700+2,100 −2,000	O2-3.5If*	SIMBAD	
WR 22 A	Bochum 10	1,905,000	-10.96	8,200	6.42 (combined)	44,700	WN7h	SIMBAD	(Note: Bochum 10 is an open cluster in Carina Nebula.)
HD 269219	LMC	1,888,000	-10.95	163,000	10.87	28,200	OB	SIMBAD	
Arches-F2 A	Arches Cluster	1,862,000+227,000 −203,000	-10.935	25,000	17.84 (J band, combined)	34,100+2,000 −1,000	WN8-9h	SIMBAD	
Arches-F7	Arches Cluster	1,862,000+227,000 −203,000	-10.935	25,000	15.74 (J band)	33,900±1,300	WN8-9ha	SIMBAD	
HSH95-36	R136	1,862,000+133,000 −124,000	-10.935	163,000	14.41	49,500+750 −1,000	O2If*	SIMBAD	
V4650 Sagittarii	Quintuplet cluster	1,820,000	-10.91	25,000	12.31 (J band)	11,300	LBV	SIMBAD	
W61 3-20	NGC 2074	1,820,000	-10.91	163,000	13.55	39,800	O5-6V((f))z	SIMBAD	
LGGS J004051.59+403303.0	Andromeda Galaxy	1,803,000+365,000 −303,000	-10.9	2,500,000	16.989	22,000±2,000	LBV	SIMBAD	
HD 5980 B	NGC 346	1,778,000+734,000 −519,000	-10.885	200,000	11.31 (combined)	45,000+10,000 −7,000	WN6-7	SIMBAD	
WR 130	Cygnus OB3	1,778,000	-10.885	21,700	12.13	44,700	WN8(h)	SIMBAD	
CXOGC J174536.1-285638 (WR 101–1 in Galactic Center)		1,738,000	-10.86	26,000	15.55 (J band)	30,000	WN8-9h	SIMBAD	
Mercer 30-7 A	Mercer 30	1,738,000	-10.86	40,000	11.516 (J band)	41,400	WN6	SIMBAD	
HD 35342 B	NGC 1910	1,722,000	-10.85	163,000	11.28	24,000	B0.5I	SIMBAD	
CPD−69 471	NGC 2074	1,706,000	-10.84	163,000	12.37	42700	O2-3(n)fp	SIMBAD	
DBSB 179-20 (WR 84–1 in DBSB 179 of G347.6+0.2)		1,698,000	-10.835	25,800	12.37 (J band)	35,000	WN8-9	SIMBAD	
VFTS 621	NGC 2070	1,660,000	-10.81	164,000	15.39	54,000	O2V((f*))z	SIMBAD	
Pistol Star	Quintuplet Cluster	1,660,000	-10.81	25,000	11.79 (J band)	11,800	LBV	SIMBAD	
Sher 18 (in HD 97950 of NGC 3603)		1,644,000	-10.8	25,000	12.51	39,500	O3.5If	SIMBAD	
Sher 47 (in HD 97950 of NGC 3603)		1,644,000	-10.8	25,000	12.67	44,000	O4V	SIMBAD	
Mercer 23-1 (in Mercer 23 near Galactic plane)		1,622,000	-10.785	21,200	10.615 (J band)	35,000	O5.5I	SIMBAD	
VFTS 1017	R136	1,622,000+420,000 −334,000	-10.785	164,000	14.52	50,120±1,800	O2If*/WN5	SIMBAD	
WR 87	HM 1	1,622,000	-10.785	9,500	11.83	44,700	WN7h	SIMBAD	
Cygnus OB2 #12 A	Cygnus OB2	1,622,000	-10.785	5,000	11.702 (combined)	13,700	B3-4Ia+	SIMBAD	
J025941.21+251412.2	NGC 1156	1,600,000	-10.77	23,000,000	19.91	7,900	LBV	SIMBAD	
Melnick 39 A	R136	1,585,000+654,000 −463,000	-10.76	160,000	13.0 (combined)	44,000±2,500	O3If*/WN6-A	SIMBAD	
Arches-F12	Arches Cluster	1,585,000	-10.76	25,000	16.4 (J band)	36,900	WN7-8h	SIMBAD	
R139 A	NGC 2070	1,585,000+235,000 −205,000	-10.76	163,000	11.94 (combined)	34,000±1,100	O6.5I	SIMBAD	
LHO 110	Quintuplet cluster	1,585,000	-10.76	26,000	13.87 (J band)	25,100	WN9h	SIMBAD	
VFTS 457	NGC 2070	1,585,000+410,000 −326,000	-10.76	164,000	13.74	39,810±1,430	O3.5If*/WN7	SIMBAD	
WR 107	Sagittarius OB1	1,585,000	-10.76	9,400	13.51	50,100	WN8	SIMBAD	
WR 140 B	Cygnus OB1	1,585,000	-10.76	5,300	6.85 (combined)	35,000	O5.5fc	SIMBAD	
WR 148 A	Runaway from Galactic plane	1,585,000	-10.76	27,100	10.3 (combined)	39,800	WN8h	SIMBAD	
R134	R136	1,585,000+410,000 −326,000	-10.76	164,000	12.58	42,170±1,520	WN6(h)	SIMBAD	
WR 31a	Milky Way	1,549,000	-10.735	24,000	10.85	30,200	WN11h	SIMBAD	(Note: Blue Bubble Nebula is a Wolf–Rayet nebula around Hen 3-519.)
CXOGC J174617.0-285131 (in Galactic Center)		1,549,000	-10.735	26,000	14.98 (J band)	40,000	O6If+	SIMBAD	
CXOGC J174725.3-282709 (in Galactic Center)		1,549,000	-10.735	26,000	16.37 (J band)	30,000	O4-6I	SIMBAD	
WR 102i	Quintuplet cluster	1,549,000	-10.735	26,000	14.31 (J band)	31,600	WN9h	SIMBAD	
WR 21a A	Runaway from Westerlund 2	1,514,000+224,000 −195,000	-10.71	14,300	12.661 (combined)	42,000	O2.5If*/WN6ha	SIMBAD	
Westerhout 49-3	W49 CC	1,514,000+528,000 −392,000	-10.71	36,200	16.689 (J band)	40,700+5,000 −4,400	O3-O7V	SIMBAD	
Brey 21 A (in NGC 1910 of LMC)		1,500,000	-10.7	165,000	11.29 (combined)	71,000	WN	SIMBAD	
HD 97950 A2 (in HD 97950 of NGC 3603)		1,500,000	-10.7	24,000	12.53	46,500	O3V	SIMBAD	
HM 1-6	HM 1	1,500,000	-10.7	11,000	11.64	44,800	O5If	SIMBAD	
LGGS J013245.41+303858.3 (in Triangulum Galaxy)		1,500,000	-10.7	3,000,000	17.612	34,000	Ofpe	SIMBAD	
10584-4-1 (in Messier 81)		1,500,000	-10.7	11,842,000	19.68	19,671	sgB[e]	SIMBAD	
Object #A (in NGC 4068)		1,500,000	-10.7	14,220,000	21.145	40,000	WN		
Sk 80	NGC 346	1,479,000+341,000 −304,000	-10.685	200,000	12.31	37,700+1,600 −2,000	O7Iaf+	SIMBAD	
R136a8	R136	1,479,000+106,000 −99,000	-10.685	163,000	14.42	49,500±1,250	O2-3V	SIMBAD	
R139 B	NGC 2070	1,445,000+214,000 −187,000	-10.66	163,000	11.94 (combined)	34,700±1,100	O7I	SIMBAD	
[HCD2002] 107 (in LMC)		1,445,000	-10.66	163,000	13.79	40,700	O4-6Vz	SIMBAD	
VFTS 542	R136	1,445,000+374,000 −297,000	-10.66	164,000	13.49	44,670±2,010	O2If*/WN5	SIMBAD	
Z15	Messier 81	1,445,000+139,000 −127,000	-10.66	11,800,000	20.495	25,000±1,000	B0.5	SIMBAD	
AB8 A	NGC 602c	1,413,000+366,000 −291,000	-10.635	197,000	12.9 (combined)	141,000+60,000 −20,000	WO4	SIMBAD	
CXOGC J174550.2-284911 (WR 102–4 in Galactic Center)		1,413,000	-10.635	26,000	15.24 (J band)	30,000	WN9h	SIMBAD	
HD 93129 Aa	Trumpler 14	1,413,000+172,000 −154,000	-10.635	7,500	6.9 (combined)	52,000±3,000	O2If*	SIMBAD	
DBSB 179-4 (WR 84–7 in DBSB 179 of G347.6+0.2)		1,413,000	-10.635	25,800	12.25 (J band)	30,000	Ofpe/WN9	SIMBAD	
LGGS J013235.25+303017.6 (in Triangulum Galaxy)		1,413,000	-10.635	3,000,000	18.007	33,000	LBV	SIMBAD	
Melnick 33Na A	R136	1,413,000+725,000 −479,000	-10.635	164,000	13.79 (combined)	50,000±2,500	OC2.5If*	SIMBAD	
WR 66	Circinus OB1	1,413,000	-10.635	16,900	11.34	44,700	WN8(h)	SIMBAD	
HD 269846	LMC	1,406,000	-10.63	163,000	11.63	28,200	OB	SIMBAD	
HD 37974	NGC 2050	1,400,000	-10.625	163,000	10.99	22,500	B0.5Ia+	SIMBAD	(Note: N135 is an emission nebula in Large Magellanic Cloud.)
WR 131	Cygnus OB3	1,380,000	-10.61	22,600	12.08	44,700	WN7h	SIMBAD	
Var A-1 (in Andromeda Galaxy)		1,368,000	-10.6	2,500,000	17.143	21,700	LBV	SIMBAD	
Arches-F2 B	Arches Cluster	1,349,000+165,000 −147,000	-10.585	25,000	17.84 (J band, combined)	33,800+2,000 −1,000	O5-6Ia+	SIMBAD	
Mercer 30-6a A	Mercer 30	1,349,000	-10.585	40,000	10.39 (J band)	29,900	Ofpe/WN9	SIMBAD	
VFTS 427	NGC 2070	1,349,000+349,000 −277,000	-10.585	164,000	13.76	41,690±1,500	WN8(h)	SIMBAD	
Westerhout 51-3	G49.5-0.4	1,349,000+626,000 −437,000	-10.585	20,000	16.998 (J band)	39,800	O3V-O8V	SIMBAD	
HD 269722 (in LMC)		1,343,000	-10.58	163,000	11.52	28,200	OBe	SIMBAD	
VFTS 16	Runaway from R136	1,318,000+341,000 −271,000	-10.56	164,000	13.55	50,600+500 −590	O2III-If*	SIMBAD	
CXOGC J174502.8-290859 (in Galactic Center)		1,318,000	-10.56	26,000	13.93 (J band)	33,000	O9I-B0I	SIMBAD	
CXOU J174516.1-290315	Galactic Center	>1,310,000	<-10.55	26,000	11.49 (J band)		WN10h	SIMBAD	
NGC 6822-WR 12	Barnard's Galaxy	1,288,000	-10.535	1,700,000	18.96	100,000	WN4	SIMBAD	
Westerhout 49-15	W49 cluster 1	1,288,000+334,000 −265,000	-10.535	36,200	18.307 (J band)	43,700±1,000	O2-3.5If*	SIMBAD	
Westerhout 51d	G49.5-0.4	1,288,000	-10.535	20,000	15.11 (J band)	42,700	O3V-O4V	SIMBAD	
[BMS2003] 578 B (in NGC 604 of Triangulum Galaxy)		1,285,000	-10.53	2,700,000	15.97 (combined)	32,000	O9Ia	SIMBAD	
HD 269896	LMC	1,259,000+400,000 −304,000	-10.51	163,000	11.36	26,900±1,500	ON9.7Ia+	SIMBAD	
S Doradus	NGC 1910	1,259,000	-10.51	169,000	10.25	20,000	B8/9eq-F0/5:Iae	SIMBAD	
AB7 A	NGC 371	1,259,000+326,000 −259,000	-10.51	197,000	13.016 (combined)	105,000+20,000 −10,000	WN4	SIMBAD	
VFTS 1021	R136	1,259,000+326,000 −259,000	-10.51	164,000	13.35	35,500±1,500	O4If+	SIMBAD	
Arches-F3	Arches Cluster	1,259,000	-10.51	25,000	16.06 (J band)	29,600	WN8-9h	SIMBAD	
Arches-F8	Arches Cluster	1,259,000	-10.51	25,000	16.31 (J band)	32,900	WN8-9h	SIMBAD	
HD 50064	NGC 2301	1,259,000	-10.51	9,500	8.21	13,500	B5Ia+	SIMBAD	
HSH95-46	R136	1,259,000+59,000 −162,000	-10.51	163,000	14.56	47,500+500 −2,500	O2-3III(f*)	SIMBAD	
NGC 2070 MH 980 (in NGC 2070 of LMC)		1,259,000	-10.51	163,000	13.68	42,700	O4V	SIMBAD	
Sk -69° 194 (in NGC 2033 of LMC)		1,247,000	-10.5	160,000	12.131 (combined)	45,000	B0I	SIMBAD	
HD 269215 (in LMC)		1,247,000	-10.5	163,000	11.94	36,300	O6.5II(f)	SIMBAD	
Trumpler 27-27	Trumpler 27	1,247,000	-10.5	8,200	13.31	37,200	O8III((f))	SIMBAD	
ST2-22	NGC 2044	1,202,000	-10.46	160,000	14.3	44,000	O3.5III(f+)	SIMBAD	
LGGS J013457.51+304833.3 (in Triangulum Galaxy)		1,202,000	-10.46	2,834,000	14.63	6,761	F3Ia	SIMBAD	
Sk -68° 137	Tarantula Nebula	1,175,000+563,000 −263,000	-10.435	160,000	13.346	53,300+5,500 −3,100	O2 III-I(f*)	SIMBAD	
Westerhout 51-57	G49.5-0.4	1,175,000+687,000 −544,000	-10.435	20,000	16.958 (J band)	42,700+2,000 −1,900	O4V	SIMBAD	
AB1	DEM S10	1,175,000	-10.435	197,000	15.238	79,000	WN3ha	SIMBAD	(Note: DEM S10 is a H II region in Small Magellanic Cloud.)
BI 253	Runaway from R136	1,175,000+410,000 −304,000	-10.435	164,000	13.76	54,000±1,500	O2V-III(n)((f*))	SIMBAD	
BAT99-92 B	Tarantula Nebula	1,175,000	-10.435	164,000	13.76	23,000	B1Ia	SIMBAD	
LGGS J013248.26+303950.4 (in Triangulum Galaxy)		1,175,000	-10.435	3,000,000	17.25	23,000	LBV	SIMBAD	
Mercer 30-8 (WR 46–6 in Mercer 30 of Dragonfish Nebula)		1,175,000	-10.435	40,000	11.658 (J band)	38,100	WN7	SIMBAD	
WR 102d	Quintuplet cluster	1,175,000	-10.435	26,000	15.18 (J band)	35,100	WN9h	SIMBAD	
WR 126 (in Vulpecula OB2)		1,175,000	-10.435	24,680	13.29	63,000	WC5	SIMBAD	
R135 A	NGC 2070	1,175,000	-10.435	163,000	13.48 (combined)	55,000	WN5	SIMBAD	
GCIRS 16SW A (WR 101k A in Galactic Center)		1,149,000	-10.411	26,000	15.5 (J band)	24,400	Ofpe/WN9	SIMBAD	
GCIRS 16SW B (WR 101k B in Galactic Center)		1,149,000	-10.411	26,000	15.5 (J band)	23,500	Ofpe/WN9	SIMBAD	
CXOGC J174516.7-285824 (WR 101–3 in Galactic Center)		1,148,000	-10.41	26,000	16.67 (J band)	35,000	WN7-8h	SIMBAD	
V1429 Aquilae	Milky Way	1,148,000	-10.41	12,800	9.89	18,000	B3Ibe	SIMBAD	
G0.121-0.099 (WR 102–16 in Galactic Center)		1,148,000	-10.41	26,000	14.972 (J band)	40,000	WN8-9h	SIMBAD	
G359.797+0.037 (in Galactic Center)		1,148,000	-10.41	26,000	16.1 (J band)	30,000	B0-2I	SIMBAD	
VFTS 512	NGC 2070	1,148,000+365,000 −277,000	-10.41	164,000	14.28	45,700+4,400 −4,000	O2V-III((f*))	SIMBAD	
HD 93205 A (in Trumpler 16 of Carina Nebula)		1,148,000	-10.41	7,500	7.75 (combined)	51,300	O3.5Vf	SIMBAD	
WR 158	Cassiopeia OB1	1,148,000	-10.41	16,300	11.282	44,700	WN7h	SIMBAD	
WR 28	FSR 1555	1,148,000	-10.41	18,700	12.98	50,100	WN6(h)-w	SIMBAD	(Note: FSR 1555 is a star cluster.)
M33C-15235 (in Triangulum Galaxy)		1,138,000	-10.4	3,000,000	17.73	29,200	WN/Of	SIMBAD	
ZH 364 (in Messier 81)		1,138,000	-10.4	11,842,000	19.59	15,860	LBV?e	SIMBAD	
HD 269700 (in LMC)		1,127,000	-10.39	163,000	10.54	19,500	B1.5Iaeq	SIMBAD	
AB9	DEM S80	1,122,000	-10.385	197,000	15.431	100,000	WN3ha	SIMBAD	(Note: DEM S80 is a H II region in Small Magellanic Cloud.)
Arches-F18	Arches Cluster	1,122,000	-10.385	25,000	16.7 (J band)	36,900	O4-5Ia+	SIMBAD	
Var B (in Triangulum Galaxy)		1,122,000	-10.385	3,000,000	16.208	9,000	LBV	SIMBAD	
SK -69 98 (in LMC)		1,096,000	-10.36	163,000	12.29	28,200	OB	SIMBAD	
Mercer 30-6b (in Mercer 30 of Dragonfish Nebula)		1,072,000	-10.335	40,000	14.25 (J band)	30,500	O6If	SIMBAD	
VFTS 3	near NGC 2044	1,072,000+277,000 −220,000	-10.335	164,000	11.56	21,000±1,000	B1Ia+	SIMBAD	
ζ^{1} Scorpii	NGC 6231	1,072,000	-10.335	8,210	4.705	17,200	B1.5Ia+	SIMBAD	
HD 270145	NGC 2122	1,047,000+101,000 −92,000	-10.31	163,000	12.17	34,750±1,000	O6.5Ifc	SIMBAD	
WR 21a B	Runaway from Westerlund 2	1,047,000+241,000 −196,000	-10.31	14,300	12.661 (combined)	48,000	O3V((f*))z	SIMBAD	
CXOGC J174532.7-285126 (in Galactic Center)		1,047,000	-10.31	26,000	10.72 (J band)	40,000	O4-6I	SIMBAD	
HD 93403 A	Carina OB1	1,047,000+49,000 −47,000	-10.31	10,000	8.27 (combined)	39,300±1,100	O5.5I	SIMBAD	
Mercer 30-2 (in Mercer 30 of Dragonfish Nebula)		1,047,000	-10.31	40,000	12.63 (J band)	21,200	B1-4Ia+	SIMBAD	
HD 97950 E (in HD 97950 of NGC 3603)		1,038,000	-10.3	24,000	13.081	46,500	O5.5III(f)	SIMBAD	
HD 229059	Berkeley 87	1,038,000	-10.3	3,200	8.7	26,300	B1Ia	SIMBAD	
M33C-10788 (in Triangulum Galaxy)		1,038,000	-10.3	3,000,000	17.95	32,000	Ofpe/WN9	SIMBAD	
Sk -69° 200	NGC 2033	1,038,000	-10.3	160,000	11.18	26,300	B1I	SIMBAD	
Sk -69° 259 (in NGC 2081 of LMC)		1,038,000	-10.3	160,000	11.93	30,000	B[e]	SIMBAD	
WR 77k (in Westerlund 1)		1,038,000	-10.3	11,000	18.86	35,000	WN7	SIMBAD	
10182-pr-6 (in NGC 2403)		1,038,000	-10.3	10,314,000	18.79	8,000	A8-F0Ie	SIMBAD	
[RP2006] 542 (in LMC)		1,028,000	-10.29	163,000	16.75	29,500	B0IV[e]	SIMBAD	
HD 93250 A (in Trumpler 16 of Carina Nebula)		1,023,000	-10.285	7,500	7.5 (combined)	46,000	O4 IV(fc)	SIMBAD	
VFTS 599	NGC 2070	1,023,000+265,000 −210,000	-10.285	164,000	13.8	47,300+820 −500	O3III(f*)	SIMBAD	
WR 75–29	VVV CL074	1,023,000+599,000 −378,000	-10.285	20,000	15.22 (J band)	37,000±2,000	WN7/O4-6If+	SIMBAD	
WR 156	Cepheus OB1	1,023,000	-10.285	13,400	11.01	39,800	WN8h	SIMBAD	
HSH95-18	R136	1,000,000+175,000 −149,000	-10.26	163,000	13.87	40,700+1,900 −1,800	O3III(f+)	SIMBAD	
[BMS2003] 867 B	NGC 604	1,000,000+585,000 −369,000	-10.26	2,700,000	16.29 (combined)	42,400	O4Ia	SIMBAD	
Melnick 39 B	R136	1,000,000+413,000 −292,000	-10.26	160,000	13.0 (combined)	48,000±2,500	O3If*/WN6-A	SIMBAD	
VFTS 259	Tarantula Nebula	1,000,000+259,000 −206,000	-10.26	164,000	13.65	36,800+500 −520	O6Iaf	SIMBAD	
HD 97950 A1a	HD 97950	1,000,000	-10.26	24,000	11.18 (combined)	37,000	O3If*/WN6	SIMBAD	
HD 97950 A1b	HD 97950	1,000,000	-10.26	24,000	11.18 (combined)	42,000	O3If*/WN5	SIMBAD	
Arches-F14	Arches Cluster	1,000,000	-10.26	25,000	16.38 (J band)	34,500	WN8-9h	SIMBAD	
BAT99-68	NGC 2044	1,000,000	-10.26	163,000	14.13	45,000	O3If*/WN7	SIMBAD	
CXOGC J174628.2-283920 (in Galactic Center)		1,000,000	-10.26	26,000	16.99 (J band)	40,000	O4-6I	SIMBAD	
CXOGC J174703.1-283119 (in Galactic Center)		1,000,000	-10.26	26,000	16.23 (J band)	40,000	O4-6I	SIMBAD	
WR 75–28	VVV CL074	1,000,000+778,000 −438,000	-10.26	20,000	14.72 (J band)	31,500±3,000	WN8	SIMBAD	

A few notable stars of luminosity less than 1 million L_{☉} are kept here for the purpose of comparison.

Star name	Bolometric luminosity (L_{☉})	Absolute bolometric magnitude	Approx. distance from Earth (ly)	Apparent visible magnitude	Effective Temperature (K)	Link	Ref.
α Camelopardalis (Runaway star from NGC 1502)	676,000	-9.835	6,000	4.29	29,000	SIMBAD	
WR 78 (in NGC 6231 of Scorpius OB1)	631,000	-9.76	4,100	6.48	50,100	SIMBAD	
λ Cephei (Runaway star from Cepheus OB3)	631,000	-9.76	3,100	5.05	36,000	SIMBAD	
P Cygni (in IC 4996 of Cygnus OB1)	610,000	-9.723	5,100	4.82	18,700	SIMBAD	(Note: IC 4996 is an open cluster in Cygnus OB1.)
WR 79a (in NGC 6231 of Scorpius OB1)	603,000	-9.71	5,600	5.77	35,000	SIMBAD	
η Carinae B (in Trumpler 16 of Carina Nebula)	400,000	-9.265	7,500	4.3 (combined)	37,200	SIMBAD	
ζ Puppis (Naos in Vela R2 of Vela Molecular Ridge)	376000+20000 −21000	-10.035	1,080	2.25	40,000	SIMBAD	(Note: Vela R2 is a OB association in Vela Molecular Ridge.)
μ Normae (in NGC 6169)	339,000	-9.085	3,260	4.91	28,000	SIMBAD	
κ Cassiopeiae (in Cassiopeia OB14)	302,000	-8.96	4,000	4.16	23,500	SIMBAD	
τ Canis Majoris Aa (in NGC 2362)	299,000	-8.95	5,120	4.89	32,000	SIMBAD	
θ Muscae Ab (in Centaurus OB1)	295,000	-8.935	7,400	5.53 (combined)	33,000	SIMBAD	
γ^{2} Velorum B (in Vela OB2)	280,000	-8.878	1,230	1.83 (combined)	35,000	SIMBAD	
ε Orionis (Alnilam in Orion OB1 of Orion complex)	271,000	-9.585	2,000	1.69	27,500	SIMBAD	
ξ Persei (Menkib in California Nebula of Perseus OB2)	263,000	-8.81	1,200	4.04	35,000	SIMBAD	
ζ Orionis Aa (Alnitak in Orion OB1 of Orion complex)	250,000	-8.755	1,260	2.08	29,500	SIMBAD	
θ Muscae Aa (WR 48 in Centaurus OB1)	234,000	-8.685	7,400	5.53 (combined)	83,000	SIMBAD	
ο^{2} Canis Majoris (in Collinder 121)	219,000	-8.61	2,800	3.043	15,500	SIMBAD	
θ^{1} Orionis C1 (in Trapezium Cluster of Orion complex)	204,000	-8.535	1,340	5.13 (combined)	39,000	SIMBAD	
δ Orionis Aa1 (Mintaka in Orion OB1 of Orion complex)	191,000	-8.46	1,200	2.5 (combined)	29,500	SIMBAD	
γ^{2} Velorum A (WR 11 in Vela OB2)	170,000	-8.336	1,230	1.83 (combined)	57,000	SIMBAD	
η Canis Majoris (Aludra in Collinder 121)	151,000	-8.21	2,000	2.45	15,000	SIMBAD	
κ Crucis (in Jewel Box Cluster of Centaurus OB1)	151,000	-8.21	7,500	5.98	16,300	SIMBAD	
λ Orionis A (Meissa in Collinder 69 of Orion complex)	150,000	-8.2	1,100	3.54	37,700	SIMBAD	
β Orionis A (Rigel in Orion OB1 of Orion complex)	120,000	-7.96	860	0.13	12,100	SIMBAD	
θ^{2} Orionis A (in Orion OB1 of Orion complex)	107,000	-7.833	1,500	5.02	34,900	SIMBAD	
Betelgeuse	87,100	-7.61	550	0.50	3,600	SIMBAD	
Antares A	75,900	-7.46	550	0.6–1.6	3,660	SIMBAD	
ζ Ophiuchi (in Upper Scorpius subgroup of Scorpius OB2)	74,100	-7.435	370	2.569	34,000	SIMBAD	
ι Orionis Aa1 (Hatysa in NGC 1980 of Orion complex)	68,000	-7.341	1,340	2.77 (combined)	32,500	SIMBAD	
υ Orionis (in Orion OB1 of Orion complex)	60,000	-7.205	2,900	4.618	33,400	SIMBAD	
κ Orionis (Saiph in Orion OB1 of Orion complex)	57,000	-7.147	650	2.09	26,500	SIMBAD	
σ Cygni (in Cygnus OB4)	52,000	-7.06	3,260	4.233	10,800	SIMBAD	
ζ Persei (in Perseus OB2)	47,000	-6.941	750	2.86	20,800	SIMBAD	
μ Columbae (Runaway star from Trapezium Cluster)	46,000	-6.91	1,300	5.18	33,000	SIMBAD	
σ Orionis Aa (in Orion OB1 of Orion complex)	41,700	-6.81	1,260	4.07 (combined)	35,000	SIMBAD	
δ Scorpii A (Dschubba in Upper Scorpius subgroup of Scorpius OB2)	38,000	-6.71	440	2.307 (combined)	27,400	SIMBAD	
ε Persei A (Áldu) (in α Persei Cluster)	28,300	-6.391	640	2.88 (combined)	26,500	SIMBAD	
θ Carinae A (in IC 2602 of Scorpius OB2)	25,700	-6.284	460	2.76 (combined)	31,000	SIMBAD	
β Canis Majoris (Mirzam in Local Bubble of Scorpius OB2)	25,000	-6.26	490	1.985	23,200	SIMBAD	
σ Orionis Ab (in Orion OB1 of Orion complex)	18,600	-5.934	1,260	4.07 (combined)	29,000	SIMBAD	
σ Orionis B (in Orion OB1 of Orion complex)	15,800	-5.757	1,260	4.07 (combined)	31,000	SIMBAD	
θ^{2} Orionis B (in Orion OB1 of Orion complex)	12,300	-5.485	1,500	6.38	29,300	SIMBAD	
γ Orionis (Bellatrix in Bellatrix Cluster of Orion complex)	9,210	-5.17	250	1.64	21,800	SIMBAD	
ι Orionis Aa2 (in NGC 1980 of Orion complex)	8,630	-5.1	1,340	2.77 (combined)	27,000	SIMBAD	
λ Tauri A (Bibing) (in Pisces-Eridanus stellar stream)	5,800	-4.669	480	3.47 (combined)	18,700	SIMBAD	
ρ Ophiuchi A (in ρ Ophiuchi cloud complex of Scorpius OB2)	4,000	-4.285	360	4.63 (combined)	22,000	SIMBAD	
δ Persei (Sarvvis) (in α Persei Cluster)	2,860	-3.901	520	3.01	14,900	SIMBAD	
α Scorpii B (in Loop I Bubble of Scorpius OB2)	2,820	-3.885	550	5.5	18,500	SIMBAD	
α Pavonis Aa (Peacock in Tucana-Horologium association)	2,150	-3.593	180	1.94	17,700	SIMBAD	
η Tauri A (Alcyone in Pleiades)	1,820	-3.409	440	2.87 (combined)	12,300	SIMBAD	
ο Velorum (in IC 2391 of Scorpius OB2)	1,000	-2.76	490	3.6	16,200	SIMBAD	
ψ Persei (in α Persei Cluster)	775	-2.483	580	4.31	16,000	SIMBAD	
γ Canis Majoris (Muliphein in Collinder 121)	715	-2.397	440	4.1	13,600	SIMBAD	
ο Aquarii (in Pisces-Eridanus stellar stream)	340	-1.589	440	4.71	13,500	SIMBAD	
φ Eridani (in Tucana-Horologium association)	255	-1.276	150	3.55	13,700	SIMBAD	
ν Fornacis (in Pisces-Eridanus stellar stream)	245	-1.233	370	4.69	13,400	SIMBAD	
ε Chamaeleontis (in ε Chamaeleontis moving group of Scorpius OB2)	100	-0.26	360	4.91	10,900	SIMBAD	
η Chamaeleontis (in η Chamaeleontis moving group of Scorpius OB2)	95	-0.204	310	5.453	12,500	SIMBAD	
ε Hydri (in Tucana-Horologium association)	60	0.295	150	4.12	11,000	SIMBAD	
τ^{1} Aquarii (in Pisces-Eridanus stellar stream)	50	0.429	320	5.66	10,600	SIMBAD	
β^{1} Tucanae (in Tucana-Horologium association)	40	0.735	140	4.37	10,600	SIMBAD	
Sun (in Solar System)	1	4.739996	0.0000158	-26.744	5,772	IAU	

Note that even the most luminous stars are much less luminous than the more luminous persistent extragalactic objects, such as quasars. For example, 3C 273 has an average apparent magnitude of 12.8 (when observing with a telescope), but an absolute magnitude of −26.7. If this object were 10 parsecs away from Earth it would appear nearly as bright in the sky as the Sun (apparent magnitude −26.744). This quasar's luminosity is, therefore, about 2 trillion (10^{12}) times that of the Sun, or about 100 times that of the total light of average large galaxies like our Milky Way. (Note that quasars often vary somewhat in luminosity.)

In terms of gamma rays, a magnetar (type of neutron star) called SGR 1806−20, had an extreme burst reach Earth on 27 December 2004. It was the brightest event known to have impacted this planet from an origin outside the Solar System; with an absolute magnitude of approximately −29 (as measured by the Swift spacecraft), if these gamma rays were visible it would have been brighter in apparent magnitude than the full moon.

The gamma-ray burst GRB 971214 measured in 1998 was at the time thought to be the most energetic event in the observable universe, with the equivalent energy of several hundred supernovae. Later studies pointed out that the energy was probably the energy of one supernova which had been "beamed" towards Earth by the geometry of a relativistic jet.

== Luminous star by galaxy ==
Galaxy	Star	Distance (ly)	Spectral type	Absolute Magnitude	Apparent Magnitude	Notes
Milky Way	G0.238-0.071	26,000	WN11h	-12.01	14.37 (J band)	
Large Magellanic Cloud	BAT99-98	165,000	WN6	-12.01	13.38	
Small Magellanic Cloud	HD 5980 A	200,000	WN4	-11.135	11.31	
Andromeda Galaxy	LGGS J004158.87+405316.7	2,500,000	O9.5Ia	-12	18.416	Likely to be multiple stars
Triangulum Galaxy	[BMS2003] 867 A	2,700,000	O4Iab	-12	16.29	
Sextans A	Sextans A 408	4,658,000	G2Ia	-11.4	13.46	
NGC 2403	NGC 2403 V14	10,314,000	F5Ie	-11.6	18.83	
NGC 2366	NGC 2363-V1	10,800,000	LBV	−10.25	17.88	
Messier 81	10584-9-1	11,842,000	sgB[e]	-11.0	19.1	
NGC 4068	Object #A	14,220,000	WN	-10.7	21.145	
NGC 1156	J025941.21+251412.2	23,000,000	LBV	-10.77		

== See also ==
- Lists of astronomical objects
- List of stars
- List of largest known stars
- List of most massive stars
- List of hottest stars
- List of oldest stars
- List of coolest stars
- List of brightest stars
- List of nearest stars
- Gamma ray burst
- Quasar
- Most luminous object
