= Pismis 24-1 =

Bright massive star system

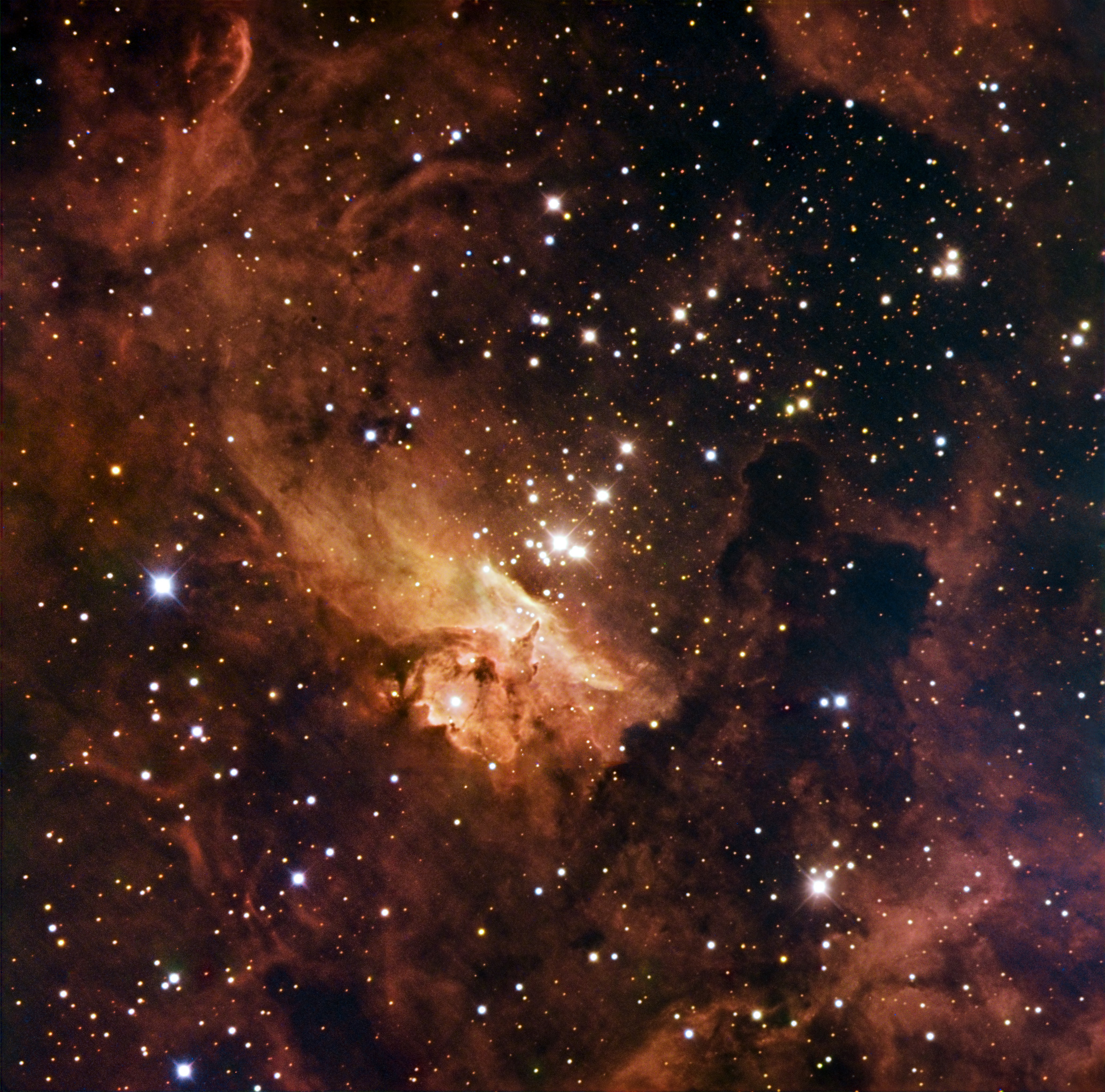
- Pismis 24-1 is the brightest point of light at the centre of this optical image of the NGC 6357 region. Credit: ESO/IDA/Danish 1.5 m/ R. Gendler, U.G. Jørgensen, J. Skottfelt, K. Harpsøe

Observation data Epoch J2000 Equinox ICRS
- Constellation: Scorpius
- NE
- Right ascension: 17^{h} 24^{m} 43.497^{s}
- Declination: −34° 11′ 56.86″
- Apparent magnitude (V): 11.00
- SW
- Right ascension: 17^{h} 24^{m} 43.481^{s}
- Declination: −34° 11′ 57.21″
- Apparent magnitude (V): 11.10

Characteristics

NE
- Spectral type: O3.5If*
- Variable type: eclipsing

SW
- Spectral type: O4III(f^{+})

Astrometry
Radial velocity (R_{v})	−2.0 km/s
Proper motion (μ)	RA: −0.1 mas/yr Dec.: −1.3 mas/yr
Distance	6,500 ly (2,000 pc)
Absolute magnitude (M_{V})	−7.50

NE
Absolute magnitude (M_{V})	−6.41

SW
Absolute magnitude (M_{V})	−6.28

Details

NE
Mass	74 M_{☉}
Radius	18 R_{☉}
Luminosity	776,000 L_{☉}
Temperature	42,500/41,500 K

SW
Mass	66 M_{☉}
Radius	17 R_{☉}
Luminosity	646,000 L_{☉}
Temperature	~40,000 K

Other designations
- CD−34°11671, 2MASS J17244349-3411570, CCDM J17247-3412A
- NE: Pismis 24-1NE, HD 319718A
- SW: Pismis 24-1SW, HD 319718B

Database references
SIMBAD	data

Pismis 24-1, also known as HD 319718, is the brightest star of the open cluster Pismis 24 within the nebula NGC 6357 about 6,500 light-years away. It was once thought to be the most massive star known, but is composed of at least three individual objects, each still among the most luminous and most massive stars known.

== Discovery ==
Pismis 24-1 was first catalogued as HD 319718, later resolved into both Pismis 24-1 and the fainter Pismis 24-16. The surrounding H II region NGC 6357 is prominent, but the compact 10th-magnitude open cluster Pismis 24 was not identified until 1959.

In 1973, Pismis 24 was resolved into 15 components of which 12 were considered member stars. The brightest was numbered first as Pismis 24-1 and tentatively considered a supergiant. It was later resolved into an O3.5 supergiant spectroscopic binary and an O4 giant star separated by approximately 500 AU.

== System ==
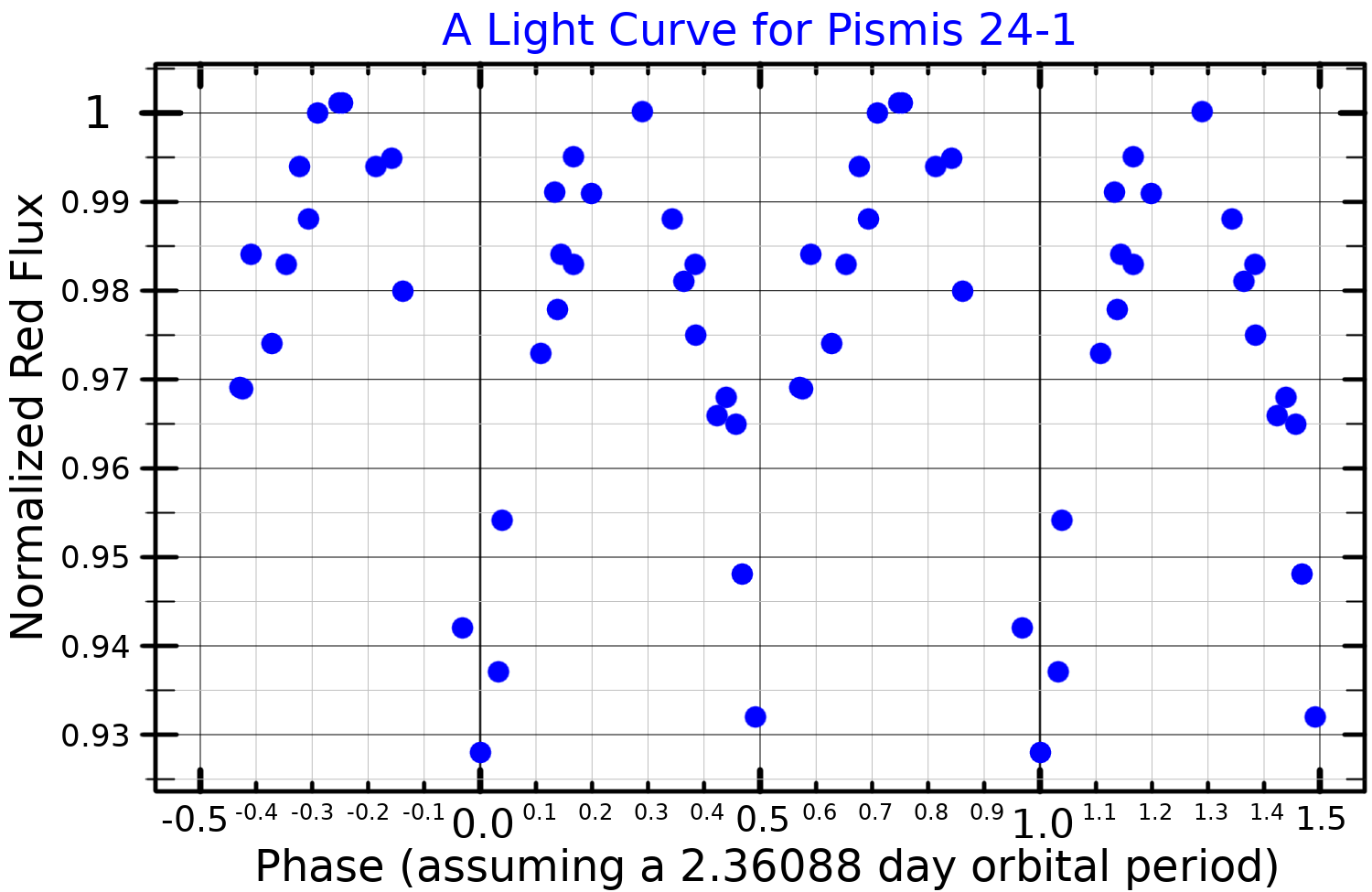
A red band light curve for Pismis 24-1, adapted from Barr Domínguez et al. (2013)

Pismis 24-1 has been resolved visually into two components, usually labelled as NE and SW from their orientation with each other. Pismis 24-1NE is slightly more luminous and hotter than 24-1SW, but is known to be a spectroscopic binary. This is surprising given the spectral luminosity classes, because it would make the individual supergiant stars less luminous than a single cooler giant star. It could be that the interaction between the components of 24-1NE is confusing its classification, or the O4 giant may also be a close binary.

Pismis 24-1 is actually a shallow eclipsing binary with a period of 2.4 days. It is presumed to be the NE component which produces the eclipses, but the separate light curves for the components have not been resolved. The light curve is symmetrical, indicating a near circular orbit, and the two eclipsing stars have very similar masses and temperatures.

The Catalog of Components of Double and Multiple Stars lists Pismis 24-1 as having two fainter companions 5.5 and 16.4 arcseconds distant. This is not surprising since it is a member of a rich open cluster only 1.5 arcminutes across.

== Properties ==
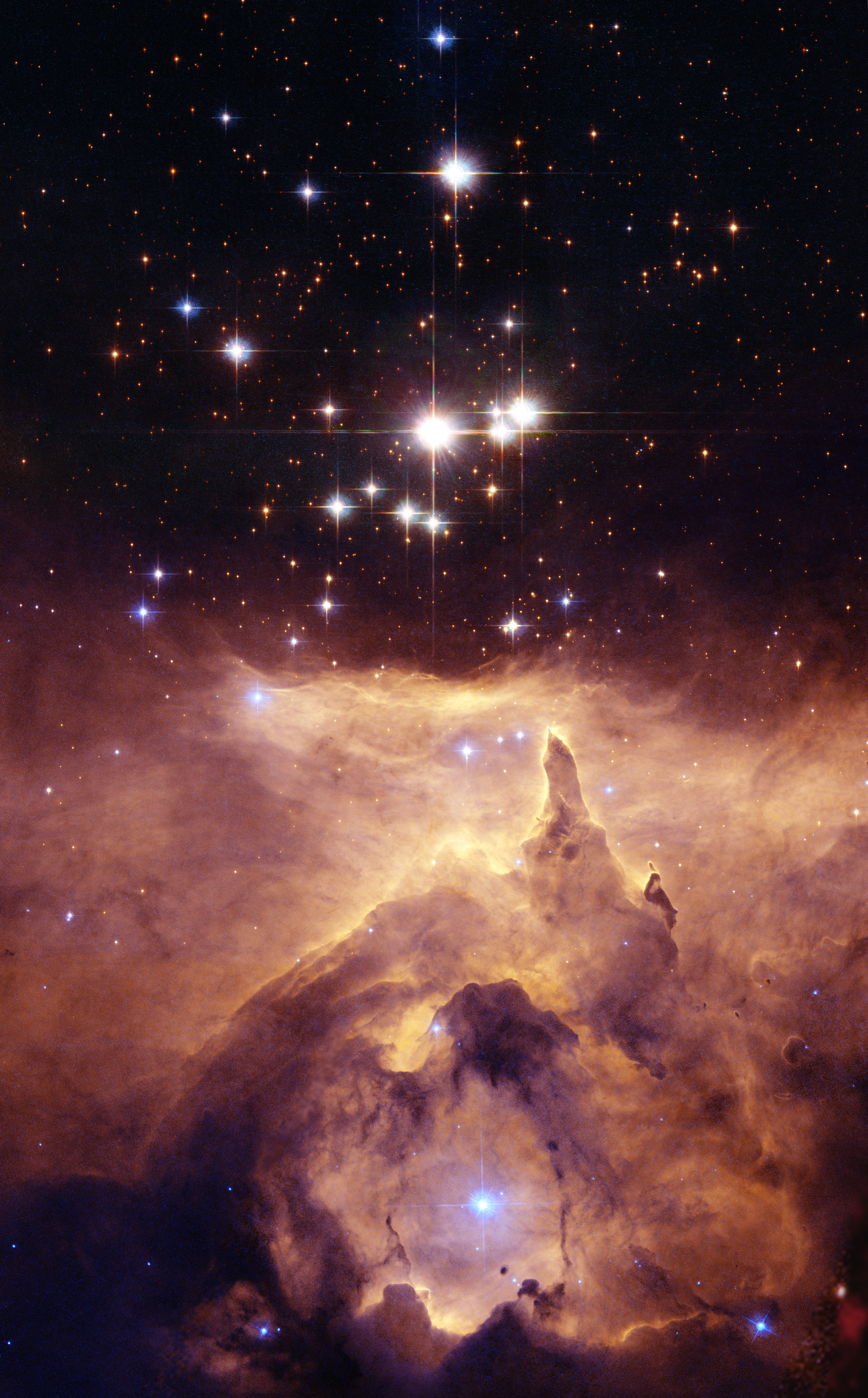
Detail of NGC 6537 with Pismis 24 (infrared and optical image)

The two components of Pismis 24-1NE cannot be detected separately, but analysis of their eclipses shows that they are almost identical, with temperatures around 42,000 K. The pair combined is nearly 800,000 times as luminous as the sun, making each individual star likely to be under 400,000 L_{☉}. The spectral type of the combined object is O3.5 If^{*} indicating an expanded star with strong emission lines of highly ionised nitrogen. Separate spectral signatures cannot be detected so it is assumed that both stars have similar spectra. The mass as a single object has been calculated to be 74 M_{☉} but each star would have a smaller mass. Hard X-ray radiation from the vicinity of Pismis 24-1 is assumed to be caused by the colliding winds of these two supergiants.

Pismis 24-1SW is apparently a single star with a spectral type of O4 III(f^{+}), indicating a temperature around 40,000 K and emission lines of ionised nitrogen, silicon and helium. The luminosity is around 650,000 L_{☉}, the radius 17 R_{☉}, and the mass 66 M_{☉}. It is classified as a giant star on the basis of its spectrum, but the hottest O stars develop these spectral features while still burning hydrogen in their cores, as a result of vigorous convection and powerful stellar winds.

When first modelled, Pismis 24-1 was thought to be a single star with a mass of 300 M_{☉} or more, higher than expected to be theoretically possible. This estimate has decreased as the star was discovered to be a binary, then a triple, and as newer models of stellar atmospheres have been developed. The latest mass estimates are well within theoretical expectations for star formation without exotic explanations.
