= HD 50064 =

Star in the constellation Monoceros

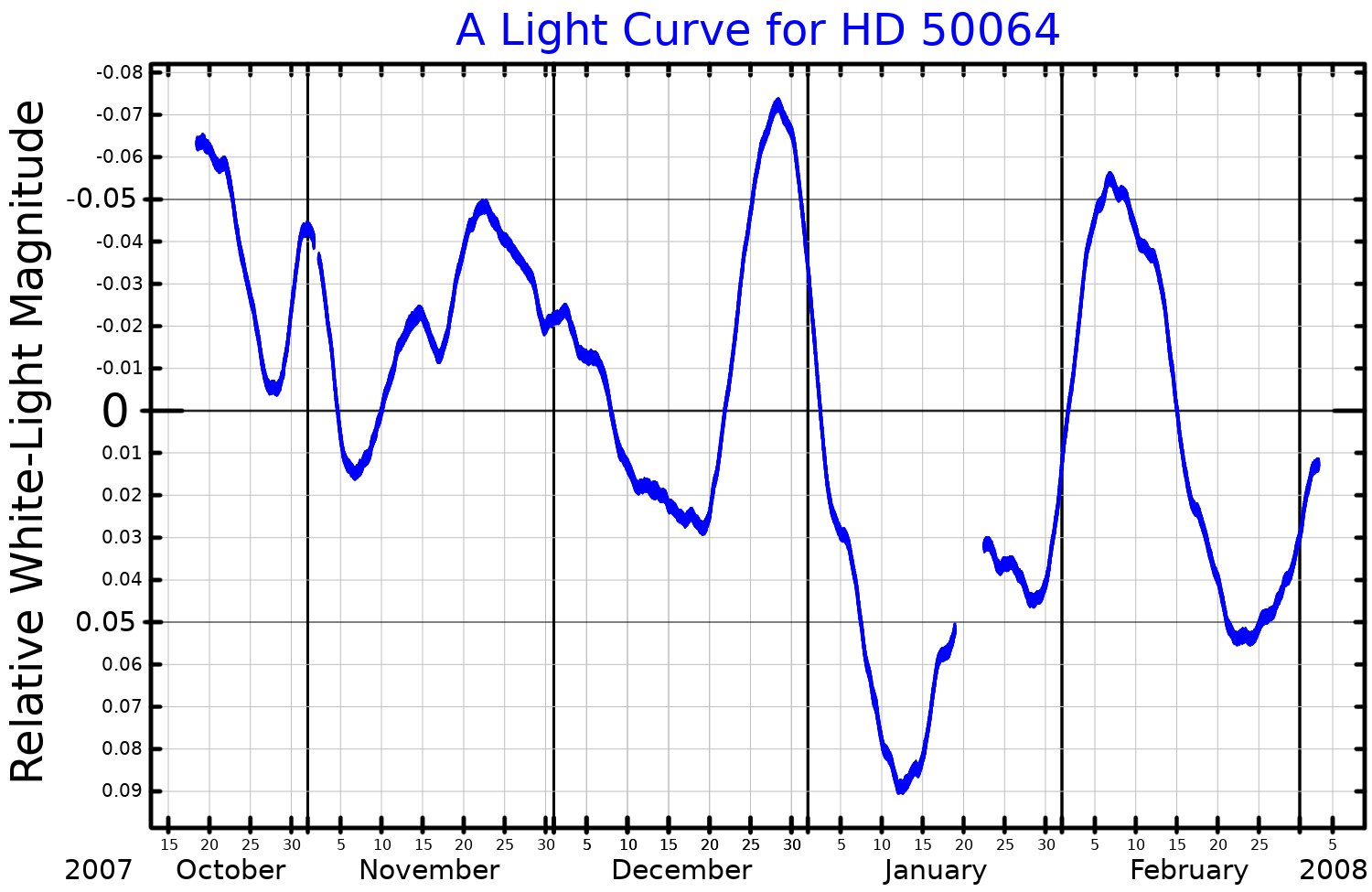
- A light curve for HD 50064, adapted from Aerts et al. (2010)

Observation data Epoch J2000 Equinox ICRS
- Constellation: Monoceros
- Right ascension: 06^{h} 51^{m} 34.1060^{s}
- Declination: +00° 17′ 50.466″
- Apparent magnitude (V): 8.21

Characteristics
- Evolutionary stage: supergiant
- Spectral type: B5Ia+
- U−B color index: −0.31
- B−V color index: +0.76
- Variable type: LBV?

Astrometry
Proper motion (μ)	RA: −0.053 mas/yr Dec.: +0.534 mas/yr
Parallax (π)	0.1846±0.0201 mas
Distance	approx. 18,000 ly (approx. 5,400 pc)

Details
Mass	45 M_{☉}
Radius	200 R_{☉}
Luminosity	1,260,000 L_{☉}
Surface gravity (log g)	1.5 cgs
Temperature	13,500 K

Other designations
- HD 50064, BD+00°1651, MWC 536, 2MASS J06513410+0017503, GSC 00148-02328

Database references
SIMBAD	data

HD 50064 is a blue supergiant located in the constellation of Monoceros, easy to see with small telescopes.

== Characteristics ==
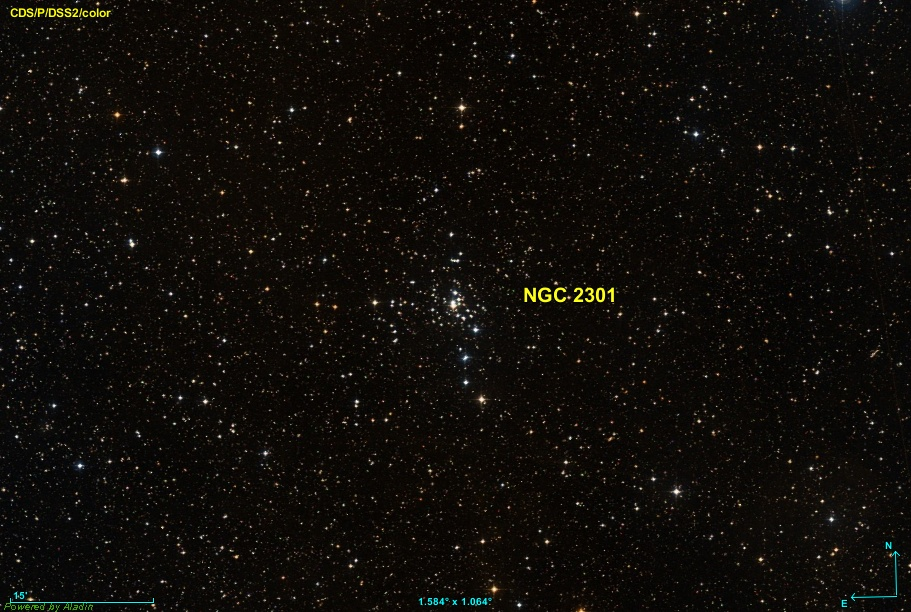
HD 50064 is the bright star (yellowish with visible diffraction spikes) to the south of NGC 2301

Although it appears quite close to the open cluster NGC 2301 it is much farther away and is not a member of the cluster. It is at least 2,900 parsecs away, more than twice the distance of NGC 2301.

HD 50064 has variously been assigned spectral types of B6, B9, and B1, and is readily seen to have a bright supergiant luminosity class. It also shows H_{α} emission lines with P Cygni profiles, indicating mass loss through a powerful stellar wind.

HD 50064 shows small-amplitude semi-regular pulsations. One strong period of 37 days has been interpreted as a strange mode oscillation and used to calculate the physical structure of the star. A luminosity of approximately 1,260,000 times that of the Sun -placing it among the brightest stars of the Milky Way-, a radius 200 times that of the Sun, and a mass 45 times larguer than the Sun, are derived. The pulsations and its spectrum are similar to those of Luminous blue variables (LBVs). The moderate mass loss suggests that it is an LBV caught pulsating and creating a circumstellar shell.
