= W49B =

Supernova remnant nebula in the constellation Aquila

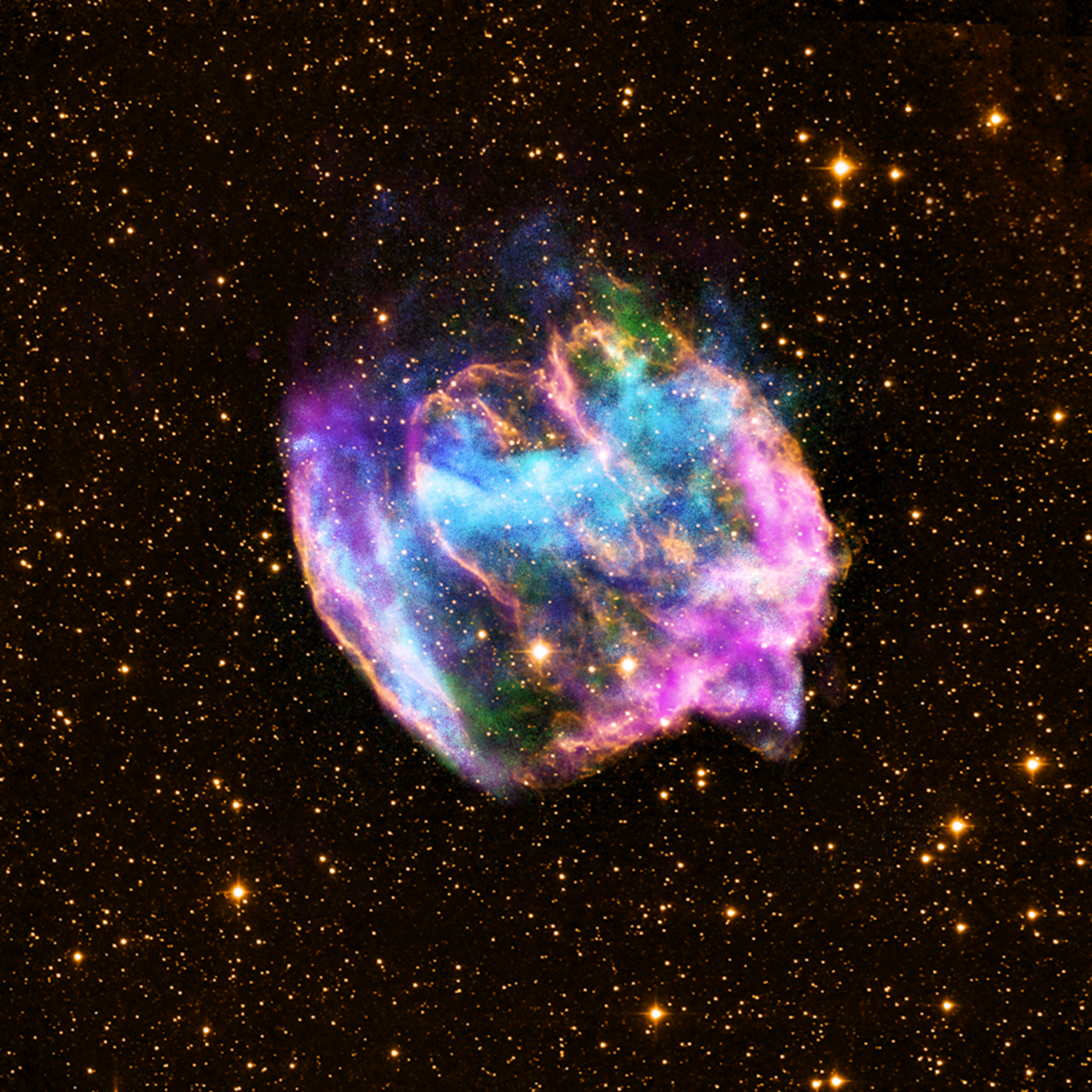
- W49B image from Chandra (x-rays in blue and green), the Palomar Observatory (infrared in yellow), and Very Large Array (radio in pink)
- Event type: Supernova remnant, astronomical radio source, astrophysical X-ray source
- S
- Constellation: Aquila
- Right ascension: 19^{h} 11^{m} 09^{s}
- Declination: +09° 06′ 24″
- Epoch: J2000.0
- Galactic coordinates: 043.275 -00.190
- Distance: 10 kiloparsecs (33,000 ly)
- Other designations: SNR G043.3-00.2, 1ES 1908+09.0, 3C 398, 3C 398.0, 4C 09.63, 3FHL J1911.0+0905, 3CR 398, AJG 95, 2FGL J1911.0+0905, 3FGL J1910.9+0906, 2FHL J1911.0+0905
- Related media on Commons

W49B (also known as SNR G043.3-00.2 or 3C 398) is a nebula in Westerhout 49 (W49). The nebula is a supernova remnant, probably from a type Ib or Ic supernova that occurred around 1,000 years ago. It may have produced a gamma-ray burst and is thought to have left a black hole remnant.

== Nebula ==
W49B is a supernova remnant (SNR) located roughly 33,000 light-years from Earth. Radio wavelengths show a shell four arc minutes across. There are infrared "rings" (about 25 light-years in diameter) forming a "barrel", and intense X-ray radiation coming from forbidden emission of nickel and iron in a bar along its axis. W49B is also one of the most luminous SNRs in the galaxy at gamma-ray wavelengths. It is invisible at optical wavelengths.

W49B has a number of other unusual properties. It shows x-ray emission from chromium and manganese, something seen in only one other SNR. The iron in the nebula is seen only in the western half of the nebula, while other elements are distributed throughout the nebula.

The outer shell is interpreted as a wind-blown bubble of molecular hydrogen within the interstellar medium, commonly seen around hot luminous stars. Away from the galactic plane, there is little gas and it is very faint optically. The shell is around 10 parsecs across and 1.9 parsecs thick. Inside the shell are the x-ray jets. Where the southeastern jet reaches the shell there is a bow-shock.

== Supernova ==
The quantity of iron and nickel within the SNR, and its asymmetric nature, imply a jet-driven type Ib or Ic supernova produced by a star with an initial mass around 25 M_{☉}. Such supernovae are thought to be the source of some long-duration gamma-ray bursts. The properties of the SNR suggest that the supernova occurred about 1,000 years ago.

Due to large amounts of galactic dust, the supernova would have been invisible to Earthly viewers.

The quantities of heavy elements such as chromium and manganese, produced by the explosive nucleosynthesis of silicon during the supernova itself, suggests that the explosion was not sufficiently energetic to produce a gamma-ray burst but does not rule it out entirely.

== Remnant ==
The remnant from a core collapse supernova may be a neutron star or black hole. No neutron star can be detected within W49B although it would be expected to be clearly visible. This, and the models which best reproduce the nebula, imply that the remnant is a black hole.

== See also ==
- List of supernova remnants
