= R145 =

Binary star in the constellation Dorado

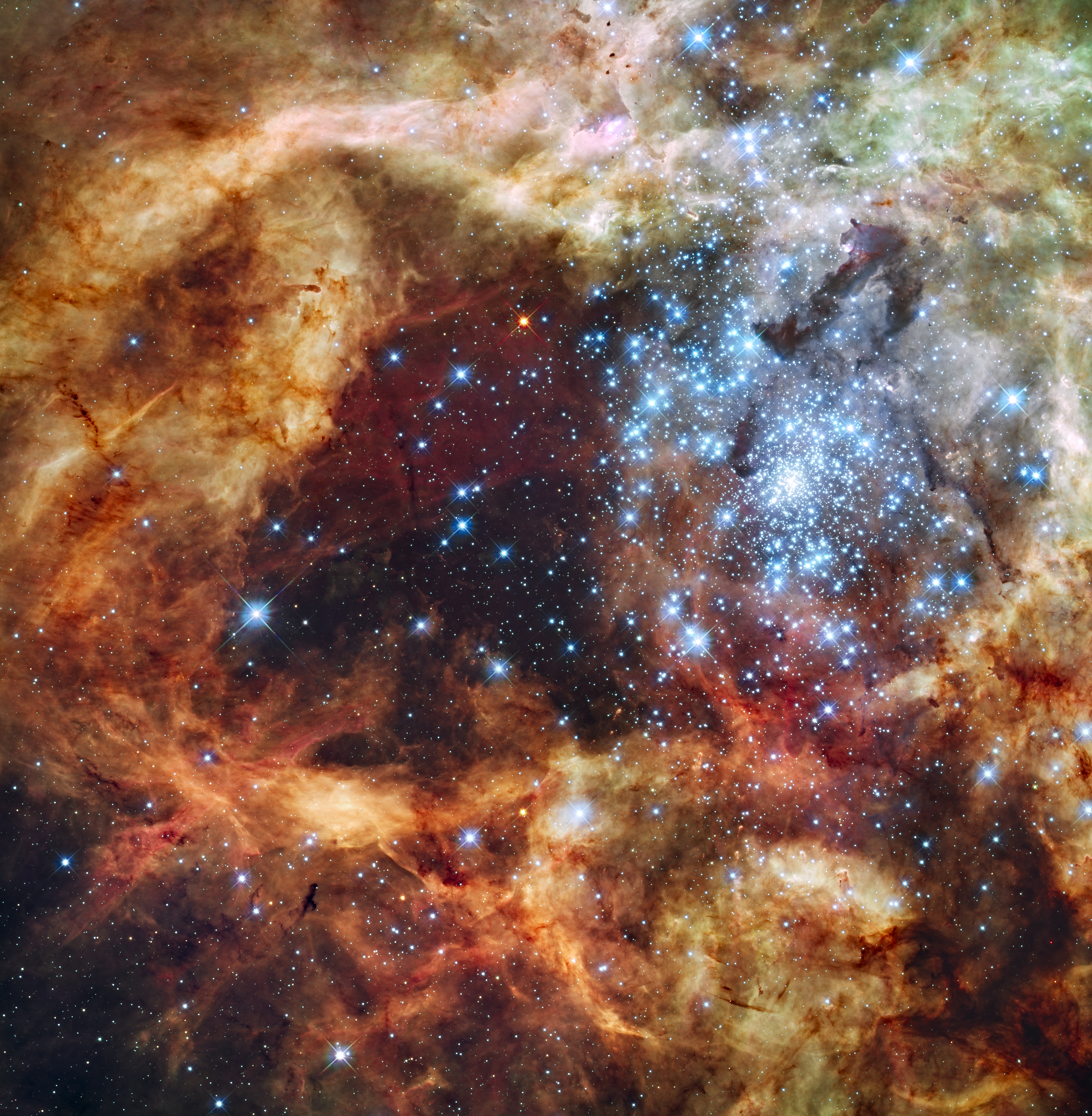
- R145 is the isolated bright star to the left of the image, near R136 (annotated at Commons); Credit: NASA, ESA, F. Paresce (INAF-IASF, Bologna, Italy), R. O'Connell (University of Virginia, Charlottesville), and the Wide Field Camera 3 Science Oversight Committee

Observation data Epoch J2000 Equinox ICRS
- Constellation: Dorado
- Right ascension: 05^{h} 38^{m} 57.059^{s}
- Declination: −69° 06′ 05.70″
- Apparent magnitude (V): 12.04

Characteristics
- Spectral type: WN6h + O3.5If^{*}/WN7
- U−B color index: −0.79
- B−V color index: −0.01

Astrometry
| Radial velocity (R_{v}) | 270 ± 5 km/s |
| Distance | 163,000 ly (49,970 pc) |
| Absolute magnitude (M_{V}) | −7.21 + −7.43 |

Orbit
| Period (P) | 158.760 |
| Semi-major axis (a) | 955 R_{☉} |
| Eccentricity (e) | 0.788 ± 0.007 |
| Inclination (i) | 39 ± 6° |
| Semi-amplitude (K_{1}) (primary) | 96 ± 3 km/s |
| Semi-amplitude (K_{2}) (secondary) | 95 ± 4 km/s |

Details

Primary
| Mass | 53+40 −20 M_{☉} |
| Radius | 20+6 −5 R_{☉} |
| Luminosity | 2,240,000+924,000 −654,000 L_{☉} |
| Temperature | 50,000 ± 3,000 K |
| Rotational velocity (v sin i) | < 200 km/s |

Secondary
| Mass | 54+40 −20 M_{☉} |
| Radius | 26+9 −7 R_{☉} |
| Luminosity | 2,140,000+882,000 −624,000 L_{☉} |
| Temperature | 43,000 ± 3,000 K |
| Rotational velocity (v sin i) | < 150 km/s |
| Age | 2.2 Myr |

Other designations
- RMC 145, Brey 90, BAT99 119, VFTS 695, HD 269928, 2MASS J05385706-6906055

Database references
| SIMBAD | data |

R145 (HD 269928) is a spectroscopic binary star in the Tarantula Nebula in the Large Magellanic Cloud located in the constellation Dorado. Both components are amongst the most luminous known.

== Observations ==
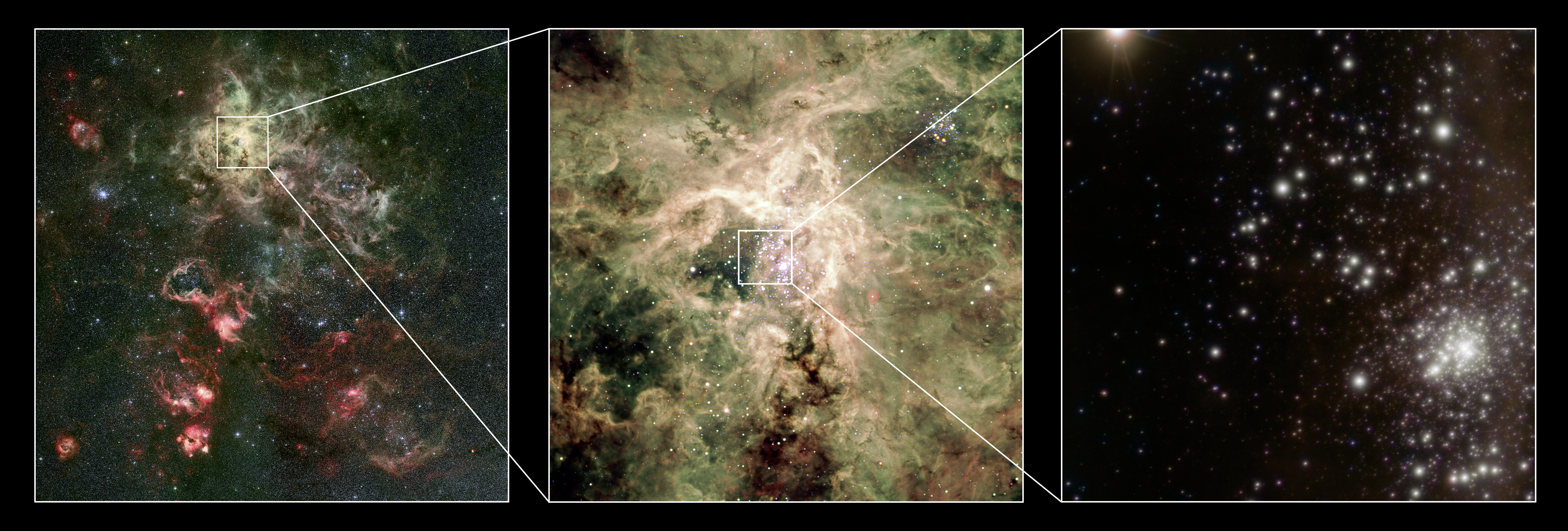
Zooming in to the NGC 2070 region. R145 is the bright isolated star to the left of the box in the middle panel.

R145 is listed in the Henry Draper Catalogue with photographic magnitude 11.8. The spectral type is given as O which then included all types of hot stars showing emission lines. It is included in the first Henry Draper Extension volume published in 1925.

In 1960 R145 was included in the Radcliffe Magellanic Catalogue of the brightest stars in the Magellanic Clouds with a somewhat uncertain WN6-7 spectral type. Stars in the catalogue are referred to by the acronym RMC and their catalogue entry number, or just R with the number.

In the first catalogue of LMC Wolf-Rayet stars, R145 is listed as number 90 with spectral type WN7. Stars in this catalogue are referred to with the abbreviation Brey after the author Breysacher. In the fourth catalogue published in 1999, it is listed as BAT99-119.

In the Very Large Telescope FLAMES survey published in 2011, R145 was given the designation VFTS 695. It was given the spectral type WN6h to recognise that it retained a significant amount of hydrogen in its atmosphere. It was also recognised that there was a second luminous star in the system but a spectral type could not be determined for it.

In 2016, the orbit and physical parameters of the two stars were calculated from FLAMES survey data.

== System ==
R145 is a double-lined spectroscopic binary system with an orbital period of 159 days. The two stars have an eccentric orbit with a separation varying from less than one AU to nearly eight AU. They have almost identical orbital velocities and hence very similar masses. The exact values depend on the inclination of the orbital plane. The inclination of the R145 orbit calculated using polarimetry is 39°. At this small inclination the formal error of 6° translates into considerable margins of error in the masses. Estimates of the masses of the two stars by other methods give larger values, suggesting that the inclination may be smaller than 39°.

== Components ==
The primary component of R145 is designated as the star which dominates the spectrum with its strong broad emission lines. It is a WN6h Wolf-Rayet star with a temperature of around 50,000 K. Although it has a WR spectral type, it is a relatively young star which still has about 40% hydrogen in its atmosphere. The atmospheric enhancement of helium and nitrogen is caused by strong convection and heavy mass loss produced by the high luminosity and probably by rapid rotation.

The secondary component is actually marginally more massive and visually brighter than the primary. It has a lower temperature of about 43,000 K and a larger size at 26 R_{☉}. Its bolometric. Its spectral type is given as O3.5If^{*}/WN7. The bolometric luminosity of each star is over two million times greater than the sun.

The masses of the primary and secondary determined from the calculated orbit are 53 M_{☉} and 54 M_{☉} respectively, but these depend strongly on the precise orbital inclination and both the masses are likely to be somewhere between 23 M_{☉} and 94 M_{☉}. Calculation of spectral and evolutionary masses suggest that the two masses are both near 80 M_{☉}. Then the ages of the stars are about 2.2 million years and their initial masses were 105 M_{☉} and 90 M_{☉}.
