= M33-013406.63 =

Star in the constellation of Triangulum

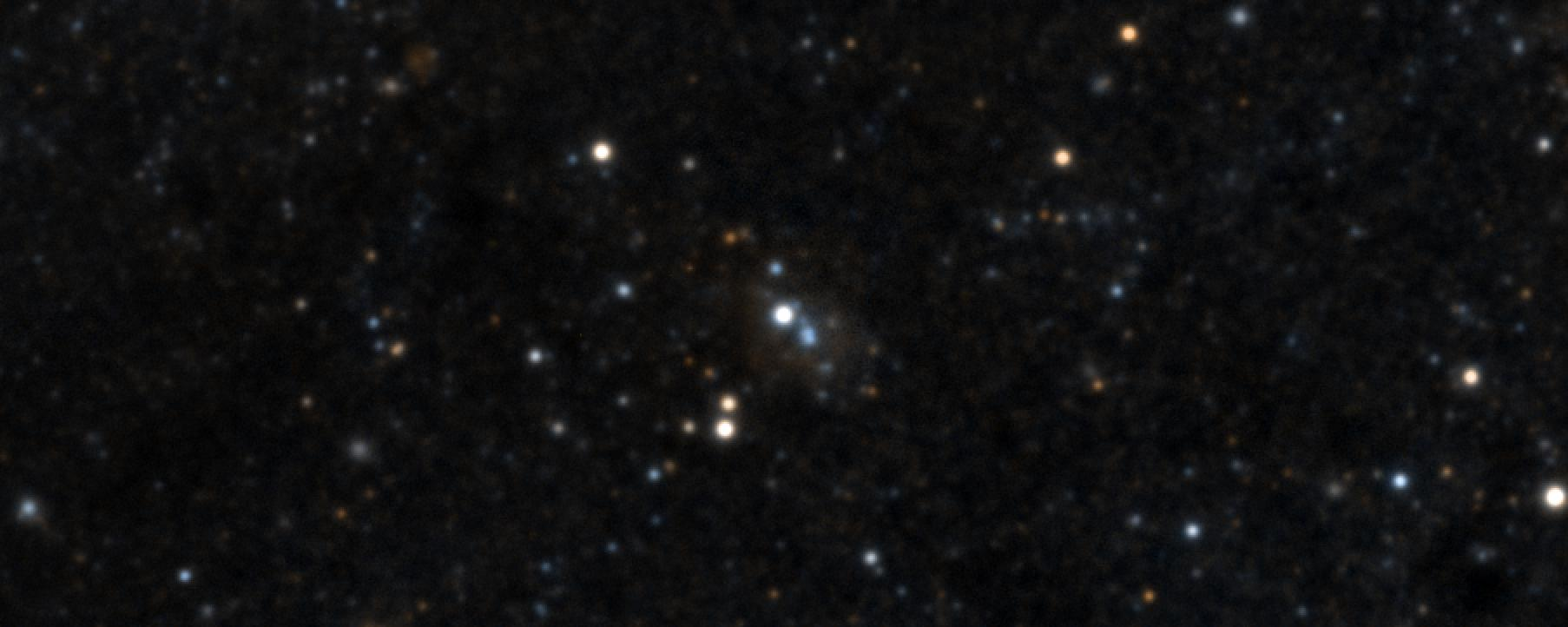
- [[File: |1806px]] M33-013406.63 (brightest star at the center) by Pan-STARRS Data Release 1 in blue, g, and r filters. Credit: NASA/UH-IfA

Observation data Epoch J2000.0 Equinox ICRS
- Constellation: Triangulum
- Right ascension: 01^{h} 34^{m} 06.63^{s}
- Declination: +30° 41′ 37.6″
- Apparent magnitude (V): 16.1

Characteristics
- Evolutionary stage: Late O supergiant or candidate LBV
- Spectral type: O
- Variable type: O9.5Ia / cLBV?

Astrometry
| Absolute magnitude (M_{V}) | –9.1 – –9.6 |
| Absolute bolometric magnitude (M_{bol}) | –12.2 – –12.7 |

Details

A
| Radius | 80 (Note: Applying the Stefan-Boltzmann Law with a nominal solar effective temperature of 5,772 K: $$\sqrt{(5,772/30,000)^4 * 4,680,000} = 80\ R_\odot$$) R_{☉} |
| Luminosity | 4.68×10^{6} L_{☉} |
| Temperature | ~30,000 K |
| Rotational velocity (v sin i) | 75±5 km/s |

B
| Radius | 210 (Note: Applying the Stefan-Boltzmann Law with a nominal solar effective temperature of 5,772 K: $$\sqrt{(5,772/10,000)^4 * 10^{5.6}} = 210.2\ R_\odot$$) R_{☉} |
| Luminosity | 407,380 L_{☉} |
| Temperature | 10,000 K |

Other designations
- LGGS J013406.63+304147.8, B416

Database references
| SIMBAD | data |

M33-013406.63, also known as B416 or UIT301, is a O-type blue evolved supergiant star in the constellation of Triangulum. It is located within the Triangulum Galaxy, which is approximately 2,380,000–3,070,000 light years away from Earth.

It is potentially one of the most luminous stars ever discovered, estimated to be approximately between 3 and 10 million times more luminous than the Sun, although it is thought likely to be a multiple star system. Modelling of the spectrum based on some assumptions about the relative sizes of the two stars suggests a secondary around half a million times as luminous as the Sun and the primary over four million times as luminous as the Sun.

M33-013406.63 is embedded within a prominent ring shaped H II region, large regions of Ionized hydrogen clouds with lots of star formation occurring in them. It is also near the center of the H II region it's in and possible associated with the nebula's origin.
