= Westerhout 49 =

Strong radio source in the constellation of Sagittarius

Emission nebula
- H II region
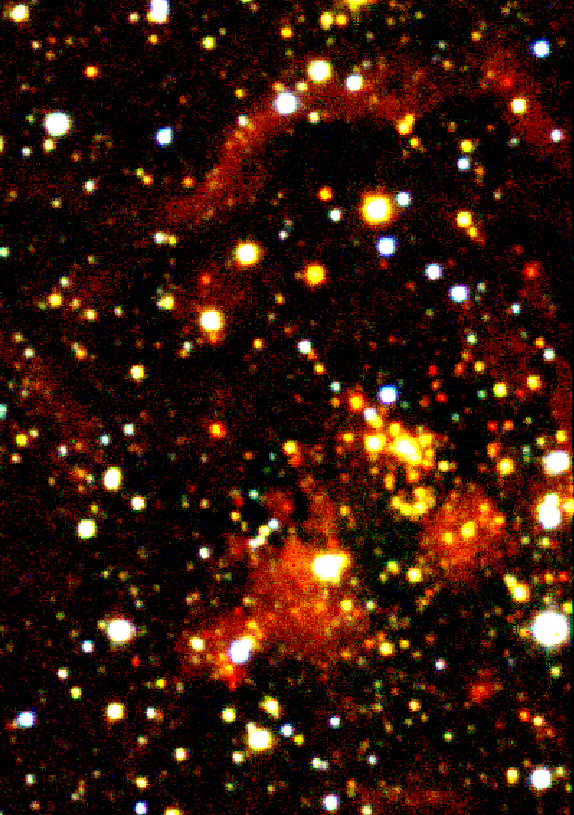
- UKIDSS JHK image of W49

Observation data: J2000.0 epoch
- Right ascension: 19^{h} 10^{m} 17^{s}
- Declination: +09° 06′ 00″
- Constellation: Aquila
- Designations: W49, Westerhout 49

In astronomy Westerhout 49 also known as W49, is a strong galactic thermal radio source characteristic of an HII region. It was discovered by Gart Westerhout in 1958.

Its distance is estimated to be about 11.1 kpcs or 36,000 light years. and it lies in the galactic plane about the same distance from the Galactic Center as does the Sun. It has been compared to the giant HII region NGC 3603 which is about half as distant. Non-thermal radiation has been found which is believed to be from an old supernova remnant. Gaseous molecular outflows have been detected as well as H_{2}O (water) masers . No optical counterpart has yet been discovered. While this is partly due to interstellar absorption, any tight clustering of stars at such a great distance in the galactic plane would be scarcely distinguishable from the general background.

A study published in 2014, where the VLT has been used among other instruments, shows the presence of a very massive star in the central cluster of this star-forming region. The parameters of said star (W49nr1, also known as [WBB2016] 1) are so far poorly constrained, but a luminosity of several million times that of the Sun is estimated as well as an initial mass between 100 and 180 solar masses, and perhaps even more, what would place it among both the most luminous and massive stars known. Another star located in the region, [WBB2016] 2, has a mass of 250 solar masses, and is also one of the most luminous and massive stars known.

== See also ==
- W49B
- List of most massive stars
