= WR 148 =

Binary star in the constellation of Cygnus

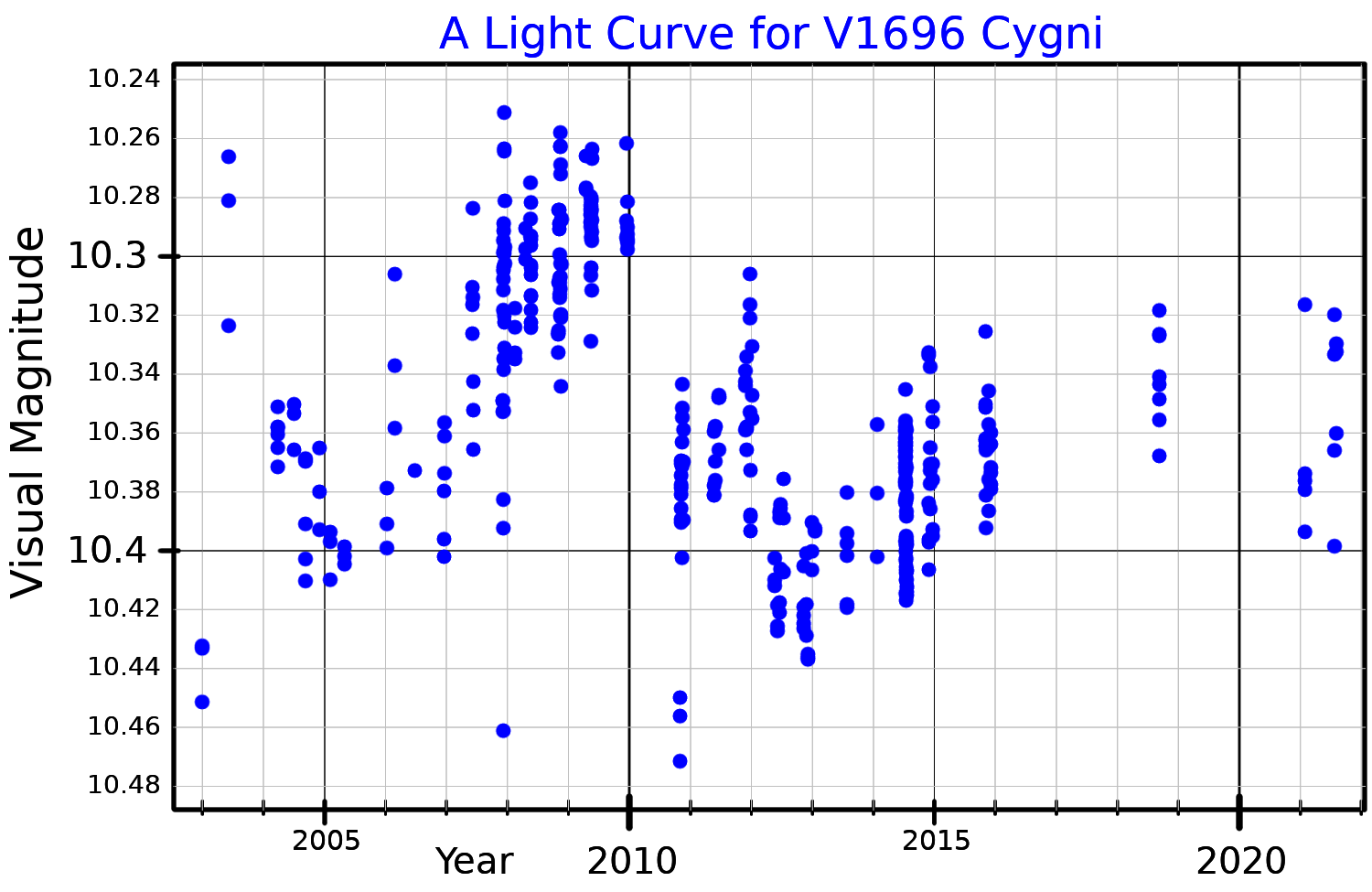
- A visual band light curve For V1696 Cygni, plotted from INTEGRAL Optical Monitoring Camera (OMC) data

Observation data Epoch J2000.0 Equinox J2000.0
- Constellation: Cygnus
- Right ascension: 20^{h} 41^{m} 21.54855^{s}
- Declination: +52° 35′ 15.1426″
- Apparent magnitude (V): 10.3

Characteristics
- Spectral type: WN8h + O5V?
- Apparent magnitude (J): 8.759
- Apparent magnitude (K): 8.318
- U−B color index: −0.45
- B−V color index: +0.57
- Variable type: Unique

Astrometry
Radial velocity (R_{v})	−131.4±2.7 km/s
Proper motion (μ)	RA: −5.629 mas/yr Dec.: −3.315 mas/yr
Parallax (π)	0.1022±0.0114 mas
Distance	8,280 pc
Absolute magnitude (M_{V})	−7.22

Orbit
Period (P)	4.317336 days
Semi-major axis (a)	46 R_{☉}
Eccentricity (e)	0
Inclination (i)	18°
Semi-amplitude (K_{1}) (primary)	88.1±3.8 km/s
Semi-amplitude (K_{2}) (secondary)	79.2±3.1 km/s

Details

WR
Mass	44 M_{☉}
Radius	26.5 R_{☉}
Luminosity	1,585,000 L_{☉}
Temperature	39,800 K
Rotational velocity (v sin i)	≤ 150 km/s

OB
Mass	37 M_{☉}
Rotational velocity (v sin i)	60+20 −10 km/s

Other designations
- V1696 Cygni, BD+52°2777, HD 197406, HIP 102088

Database references
SIMBAD	data

WR 148 is a spectroscopic binary in the constellation Cygnus. The primary star is a Wolf–Rayet star and one of the most luminous stars known. The secondary has been suspected of being a stellar-mass black hole but may be a class O main sequence star.

WR 148 shows a classic WN8h spectrum, but with the addition of weak central absorption on some of the emission lines. N_{III} and N_{IV} emission lines are stronger than N_{V}, and He_{I} lines are stronger than He_{II}, The Balmer series hydrogen lines and some other lines have P Cygni profiles.

WR 148 is erratically variable on timescales ranging from seconds to years, but it shows consistent brightness and radial velocity variations with a period of 4.32 days. There is little doubt that it is a binary system, due to the regular variations and the presence of hard x-ray radiation from colliding winds, but the secondary is not clearly detectable in the spectrum. One proposal for a companion that would match the faint absorption features would be a B3 subgiant, but that is not compatible with the orbit. An early calculated orbit based on faint absorption features gave a relatively large mass ratio which imply either a very high companion mass, meaning a black hole, or an unreasonably low primary mass for a luminous WR star. Another analysis of the spectrum finds absorption features consistent with an O5 star, similar masses for the two components, and only a small orbital inclination.

Because of its erratic changes in apparent magnitude at so many frequencies WR 148 is classified in the General Catalogue of Variable Stars as a unique type of variable, not a member of any of the defined classes. The shape of the light curve is unusual and has been modelled as being produced by an extended secondary object which may be an ionised cavity in the dense wind of the primary star, produced as the secondary orbits at a distance comparable to the radius of the primary star.

WR 148 is found unusually far from the galactic plane for a Wolf–Rayet star, at 500–800 pc. Young massive stars such as WN8h WR stars are members of the thin disc population, on average only 60 pc from the galactic plane. It is suggested that WR 148 is a runaway from a supernova explosion. Calculations based on its large peculiar velocity of 197 km/s, current binary orbit, and likely lifetime since any supernova, are consistent with expulsion from a very massive triple system.
