= Westerhout 49-2 =

Star in the constellation Aquila

Observation data Epoch J2000 Equinox ICRS
- Constellation: Aquila
- Right ascension: 19^{h} 10^{m} 21.858^{s}
- Declination: 09° 05′ 02.53″

Characteristics
- Spectral type: O2-3.5If^{*}

Astrometry
Distance	36,200 ly (11,100 pc)

Details
Mass	250±120 M_{☉}
Radius	55.29 (Note: Applying the Stefan–Boltzmann law with a nominal solar effective temperature of 5,772 K: $$\sqrt{(5772/35,500)^4 * 4,365,000} = 55.29\ R\odot$$) R_{☉}
Luminosity	4,365,000 L_{☉}
Temperature	35,500 K

Other designations
- TIC 202340617, 2MASS J19102185+0905025

Database references
SIMBAD	data

Westerhout 49-2 (W49-2) is a very massive and luminous star in the H II region Westerhout 49. At a mass of 250 solar masses (although with significant uncertainty) and a luminosity of over 4 million L_{☉}, it is one of the most massive and most luminous known stars.

== Properties ==
Westerhout 49-2 is located within the H II region Westerhout 49, about 11.1 kiloparsecs from the Sun. The star is heavily reddened, by nearly 5 magnitudes in the K band, the most of any star in the region. Westerhout 49-2 is classified as an evolved slash star, with a spectral type of O2-3.5If^{*}. The star is one of the most luminous stars known, with a luminosity of 4,365,000 L_{☉}, and has a temperature of about 35,500 K, corresponding to a radius of over 55 times that of the Sun.

=== Uncertainties ===
There is significant uncertainty about Westerhout 49-2's properties. One estimate using mass-luminosity relations finds a mass between 90 and 240 M_{☉}. Its mass is likely higher than the theoretical upper limit of 150 M_{☉}, which means it could be a binary, if x-rays are detected. Westerhout 49-1, 49-2 and 49-12 are all bright x-ray sources, which means they could all be binary stars and their masses would be lower than the predicted mass if they were single stars.
