= G0.238-0.071 =

Luminous Wolf-Rayet star in the Galactic Center

Observation data Epoch J2000.0 Equinox ICRS
- Constellation: Sagittarius
- Right ascension: 17^{h} 46^{m} 27.60^{s}
- Declination: −28° 46′ 11.8″

Characteristics
- Evolutionary stage: Wolf–Rayet
- Spectral type: WN11h

Astrometry
Distance	26,673 ly (8,178 pc)
Absolute bolometric magnitude (M_{bol})	–12.01

Details
Radius	39 - 48 (Note: Applying the Stefan-Boltzmann Law with a nominal solar effective temperature of 5,772 K: $$\sqrt{(5,772/39,500)^4 * 5,012,000} = 48\ R_\odot$$ $$\sqrt{(5,772/44,000)^4 * 5,012,000} = 39\ R_\odot$$) R_{☉}
Luminosity	5,012,000 L_{☉}
Temperature	39,500 - 44,000 K

Other designations
- [DWC2011] 56, [MCD2010] 18

Database references
SIMBAD	data

G0.238-0.071, also known as [DWC2011] 56 or [MCD2010] 18, is a Wolf-Rayet Star in the constellation of Sagittarius. It is located near the Galactic Center, which is around 27,000 light years from Earth.

G0.238-0.071 is currently the most luminous star known in the Milky Way, having around 5 million times the luminosity of the Sun. This also makes it among the most luminous stars ever discovered. It has a spectral type of WN11h with an effective temperature between 39,500 and 44,000 K which would give a radius between 39 and 48 times that of the Sun. Its mass is unknown but WNh stars with similar properties to G0.238-0.071 are massive, usually well over 100 times the mass of the Sun.
