= NGC 2081 =

Emission nebula in the constellation Dorado

Nebula
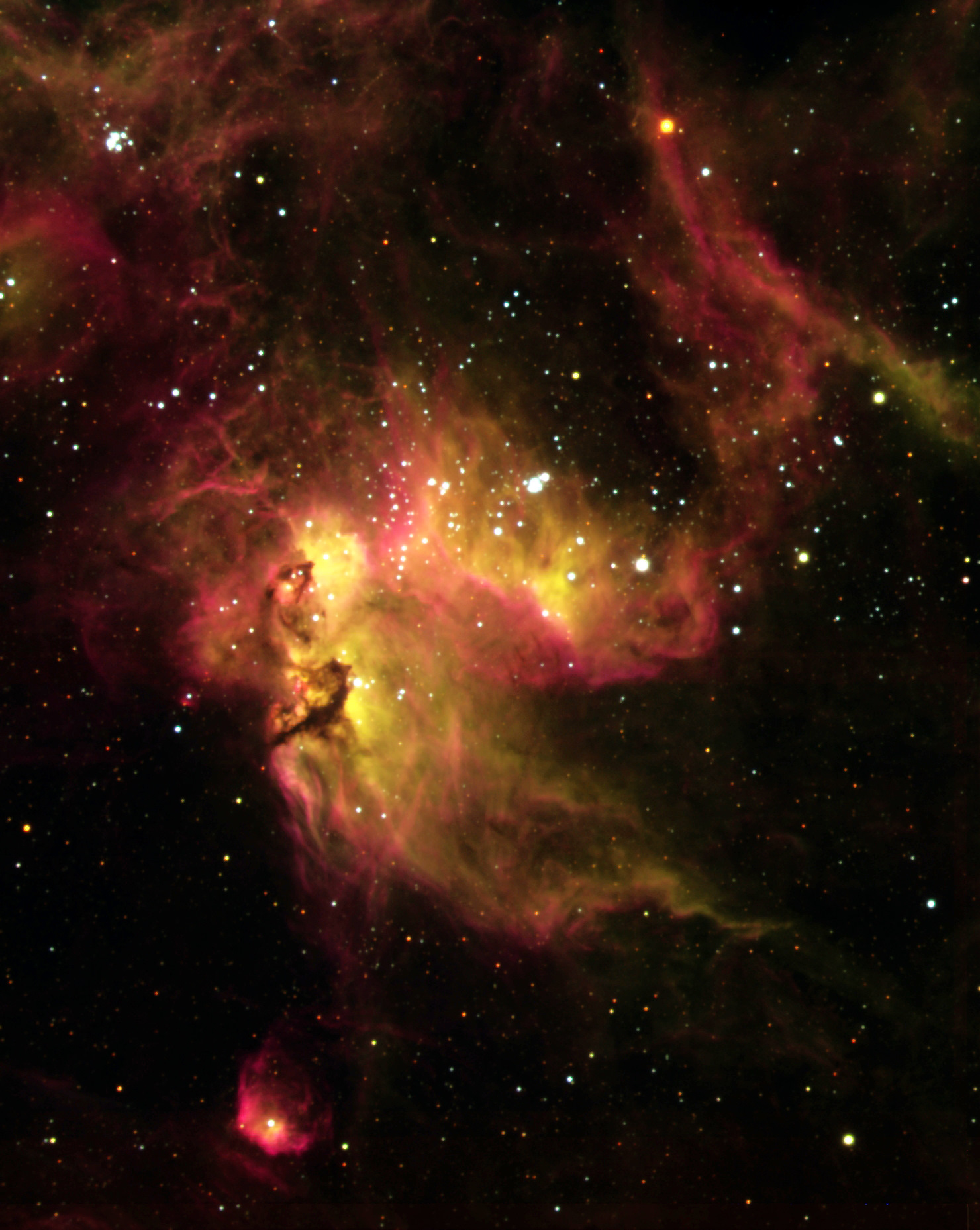

Observation data: J2000 epoch
- Right ascension: 05^{h} 39^{m} 11.8^{s}
- Declination: −69° 30′ 16″
- Constellation: Dorado

NGC 2081 is an open cluster associated with an emission nebula located in the constellation Dorado. NGC 2081 is located in the Large Magellanic Cloud. NGC 2081 was discovered by British astronomer John Herschel between 1834 and 1836.

== See also ==
- List of NGC objects (2001–3000)
- New General Catalogue
