= NGC 1156 =

Dwarf irregular galaxy in Aries

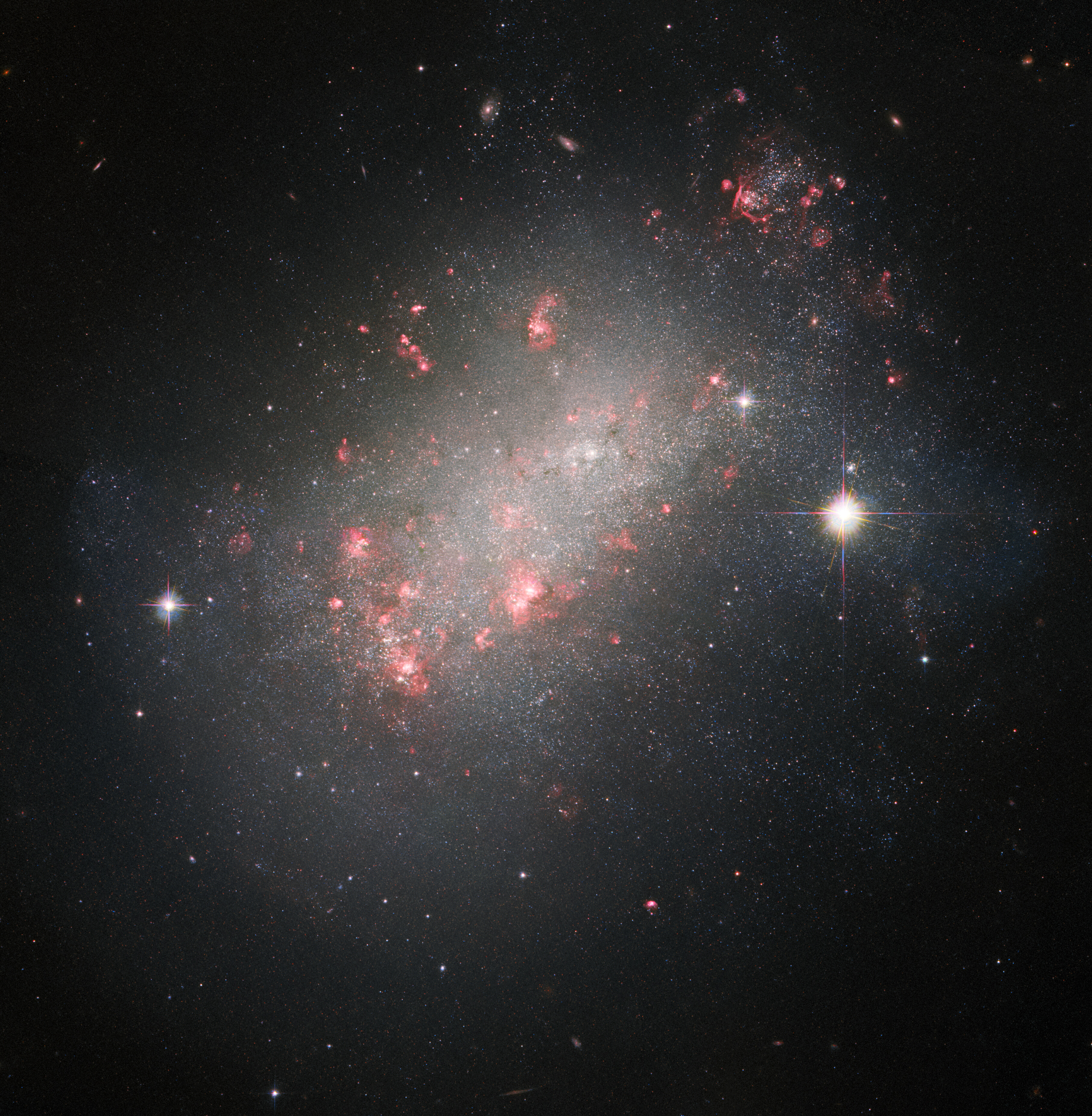
- NGC 1156 imaged by the Hubble Space Telescope

Observation data (J2000 epoch)
- Constellation: Aries
- Right ascension: 02^{h} 59^{m} 42.2^{s}
- Declination: +25° 14′ 14″
- Redshift: 375 ± 1 km/s
- Apparent magnitude (V): 12.3

Characteristics
- Type: IB(s)m
- Apparent size (V): 3.3′ × 2.5′

Other designations
- UGC 2455, PGC 11329

NGC 1156 is a dwarf irregular galaxy in the constellation Aries of the type ibm. It is considered a Magellanic-type irregular. The galaxy has a larger than average core, and contains zones of contra-rotating gas. The counter-rotation is thought to be the result of tidal interactions with another gas rich galaxy some time in the past.

It has a H II nucleus.

The AGES survey has discovered a candidate dark galaxy close to NGC 1156, one of only a few so far found.
