= Dragonfish Nebula =

Emission nebula and star-forming region in the constellation Crux

Emission nebula
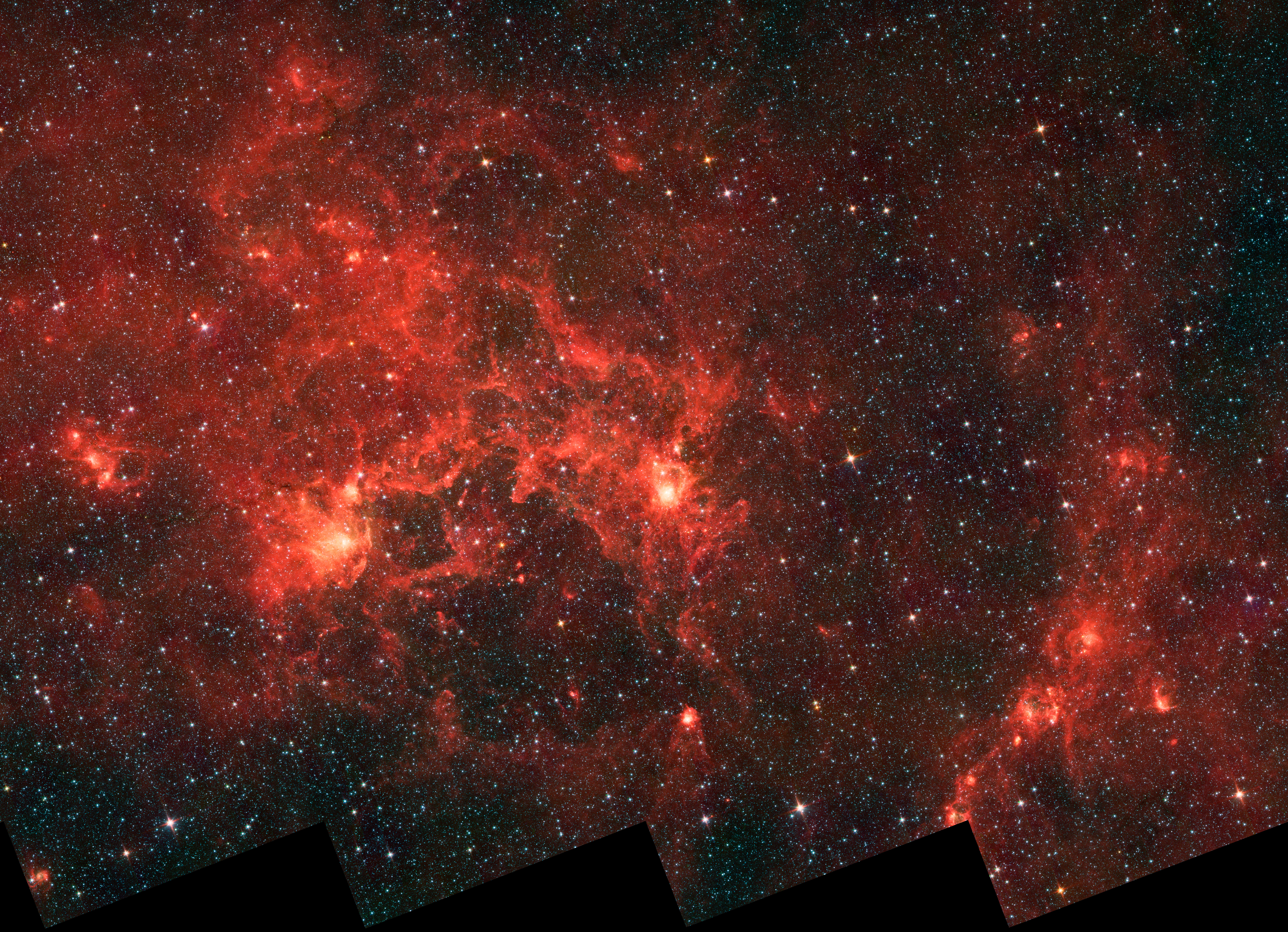
- Infrared image from the Spitzer Space Telescope

Observation data: J2000 epoch
- Right ascension: 12^{h} 11^{m} 27.5^{s}
- Declination: −62° 55′ 10″
- Distance: 32,000 ly (9,700 pc)
- Constellation: Crux

Physical characteristics
- Dimensions: 130′
- Designations: GAL 298.4-00.4

The Dragonfish Nebula, as it is known for its appearance on infrared images, is a massive emission nebula and star-forming region 30,000 light-years from the Sun in the direction of the constellation Crux, the Southern Cross.

The Dragonfish Nebula gets its name from a giant toothy fish known as the deep-sea dragonfish. The giant stars in this nebula blow a bubble in the surrounding gas. This bubble is over 100 light-years long and forms the mouth of the dragonfish. The two largest and luminous stars, which form its eyes, are said to be newly formed stars. The stars heat up the surrounding gas, giving off infrared light. The Dragonfish Nebula contains some of the most massive stars in the Milky Way galaxy.

This nebula was first discovered in 2010 by Mubdi Rahman and Norman Murray from the University of Toronto. They discovered a cloud of ionized gas which led them to suspect that it was formed from the radiation of nearby stars. Since then more than four hundred stars have been found and there is reason to believe that many smaller stars are hiding in the cluster. The ionized gas around this cluster produces more microwaves than most clusters in our galaxy, making the Dragonfish Nebula the brightest and most massive cluster discovered so far.

== Characteristics ==
Due to its distance and location, it is totally invisible in visible light because the interstellar dust absorbs and reddens its light, hiding it. So in order to study it, wavelengths that are not affected, like infrared, are required.

Research done with the help of the Spitzer Space Telescope has shown this object has a size of 450 light-years, having a large cavity with a diameter of 100 light-years that was created by the strong stellar winds of the young and massive stars inside it.

As of 2011, approximately 400 stars of spectral types O and B have been identified within the nebula. Subsequent studies have confirmed not only at least 15 O-type stars but also 3 luminous blue variable/Wolf–Rayet star candidates. They also have calculated the total mass of the stars associated with the Dragonfish nebula as 10^{5} solar masses, a mass only comparable with that of the super star cluster Westerlund 1, the most massive OB association and the brightest nebula known in our galaxy.
