= NGC 4068 =

Dwarf irregular galaxy

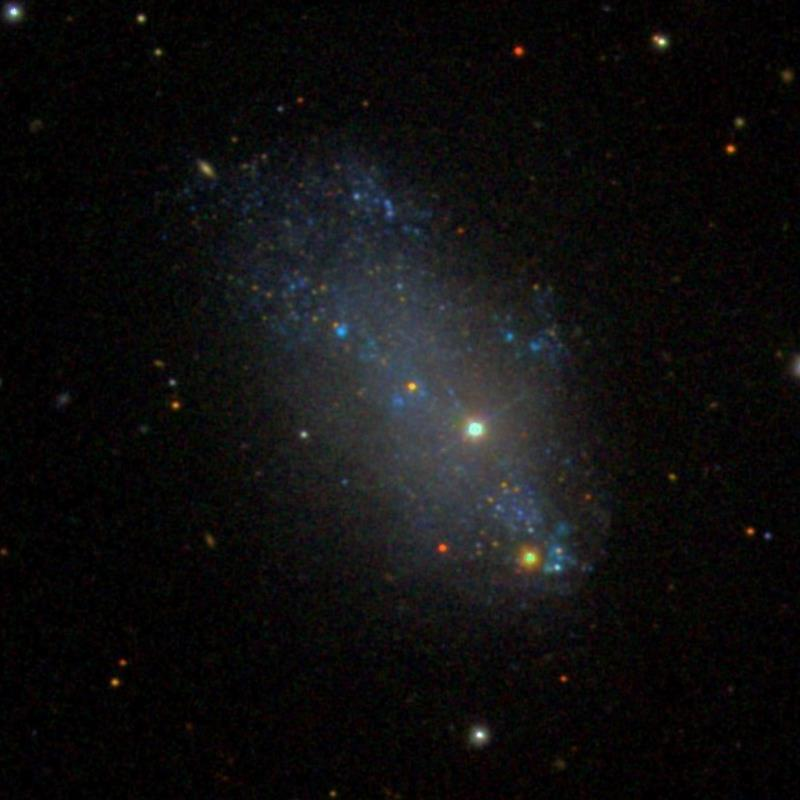
- A picture of the NGC 4068 galaxy from the Sloan Digital Sky Survey.

Observation data
- Constellation: Ursa Major
- Right ascension: 12^{h} 04^{m} 2.49^{s}
- Declination: +52° 35′ 26″
- Distance: 4.36 Mpc (14.2 Mly)
- Apparent magnitude (B): 13.3

Characteristics
- Type: Dwarf Irregular Galaxy (dIrr)
- Size: 10,000–12,000 ly (3,100–3,700 pc)

Other designations
- IC 757, LEDA 38148, MCG+09-20-079, UGC 7047, II 781, GC 2692

NGC 4068 is an irregular galaxy located 4.36 megaparsecs (14.2 million light-years away in the constellation Ursa Major. It was discovered on 12 April 1789 by William Herschel using a 18.7-inch f/13 speculum reflector telescope.

== Characteristics ==
NGC 4068 is a dwarf irregular galaxy 10,000–12,000 light-years in diameter. As is the case with most observed galaxies of its type, 4068 has low-metallicity. It is currently undergoing a starburst.

== Observations ==
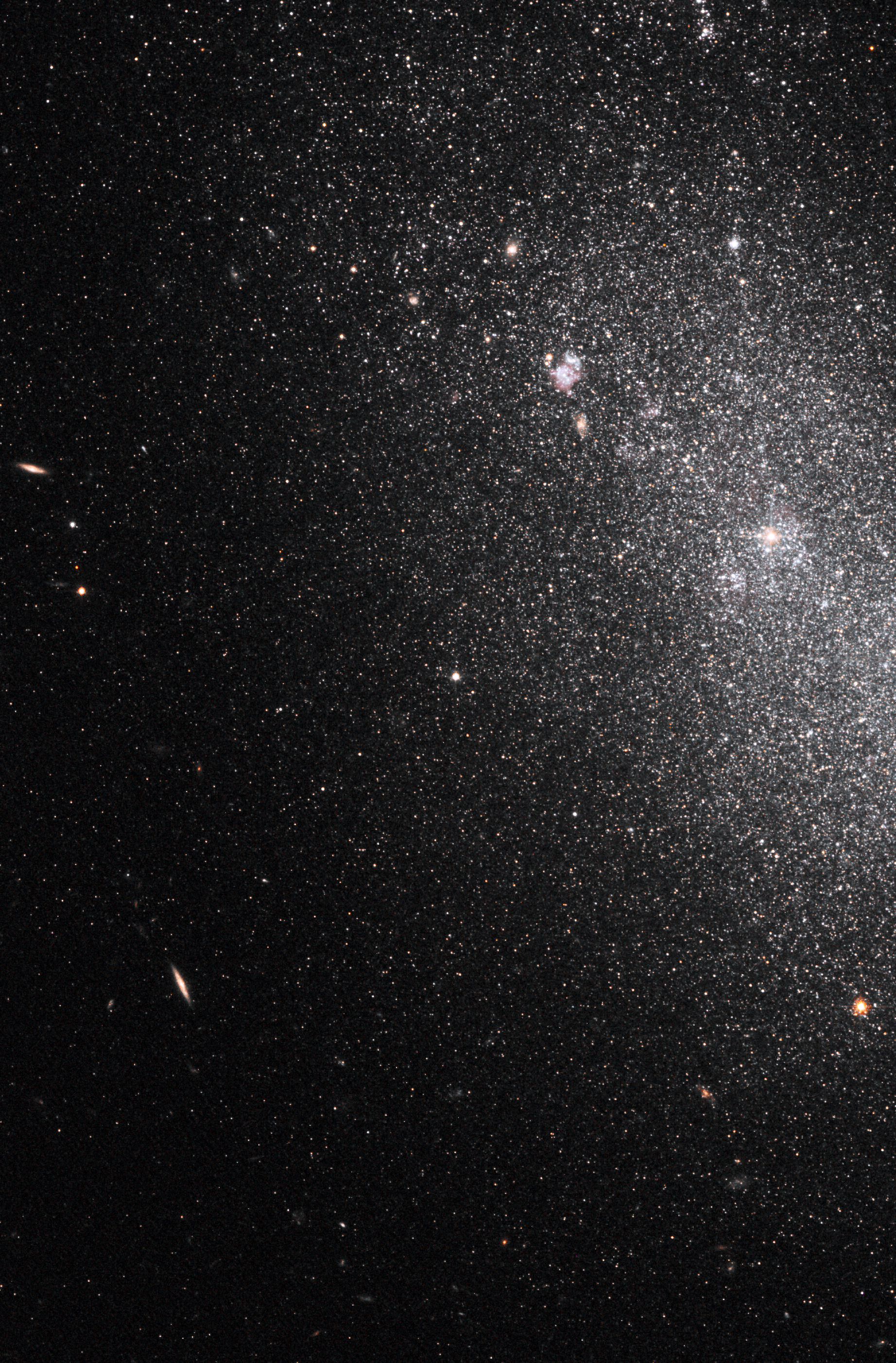
NGC 4068 imaged by the Hubble Space Telescope

In 2014–2015, researchers using SCORPIO-2 obtained the first two spectroscopic observations of an object later dubbed Object #A. Said object was later observed again twice in 2020 using terahertz time-domain spectroscopy (TDS). Researchers consider the central star in Object #A to be a single star due to TDS observations, excluding the possibility of it being a cluster-ionizing nebula. They hypothesize said star to be 70–80 M_{☉} and in the late stage of its evolution, with the most likely categorization being a Wolf–Rayet star.
