= Mu Normae =

Star in the constellation Norma

μ Normae
- Location of μ Nor (circled)

Observation data Epoch J2000.0 Equinox ICRS
- Constellation: Norma
- Right ascension: 16^{h} 34^{m} 05.01936^{s}
- Declination: −44° 02′ 43.1206″
- Apparent magnitude (V): 4.91 (4.87 - 4.98)

Characteristics
- Spectral type: O9.7Iab
- Apparent magnitude (U): 4.05
- Apparent magnitude (B): 4.99
- Apparent magnitude (J): 4.74
- Apparent magnitude (H): 4.679
- Apparent magnitude (K): 4.612
- U−B color index: −0.84
- B−V color index: +0.05
- Variable type: Suspected α Cygni

Astrometry
Radial velocity (R_{v})	+6.30 km/s
Proper motion (μ)	RA: +0.865 mas/yr Dec.: −2.985 mas/yr
Parallax (π)	1.0967±0.1007 mas
Distance	3,260 ly (1,000 pc)
Absolute magnitude (M_{V})	−6.45

Details
Mass	33.3 M_{☉}
Radius	25 R_{☉}
Luminosity (bolometric)	339,000 L_{☉}
Surface gravity (log g)	2.90 cgs
Temperature	28,000 K
Rotational velocity (v sin i)	57 km/s
Age	4.7 Myr

Other designations
- Mu Normae, HD 149038, HR 6155, HIP 81122, CD−43°10900

Database references
SIMBAD	data

μ Normae, Latinised as Mu Normae, is a blue supergiant star of spectral type O9.7 Iab, located in the constellation of Norma.

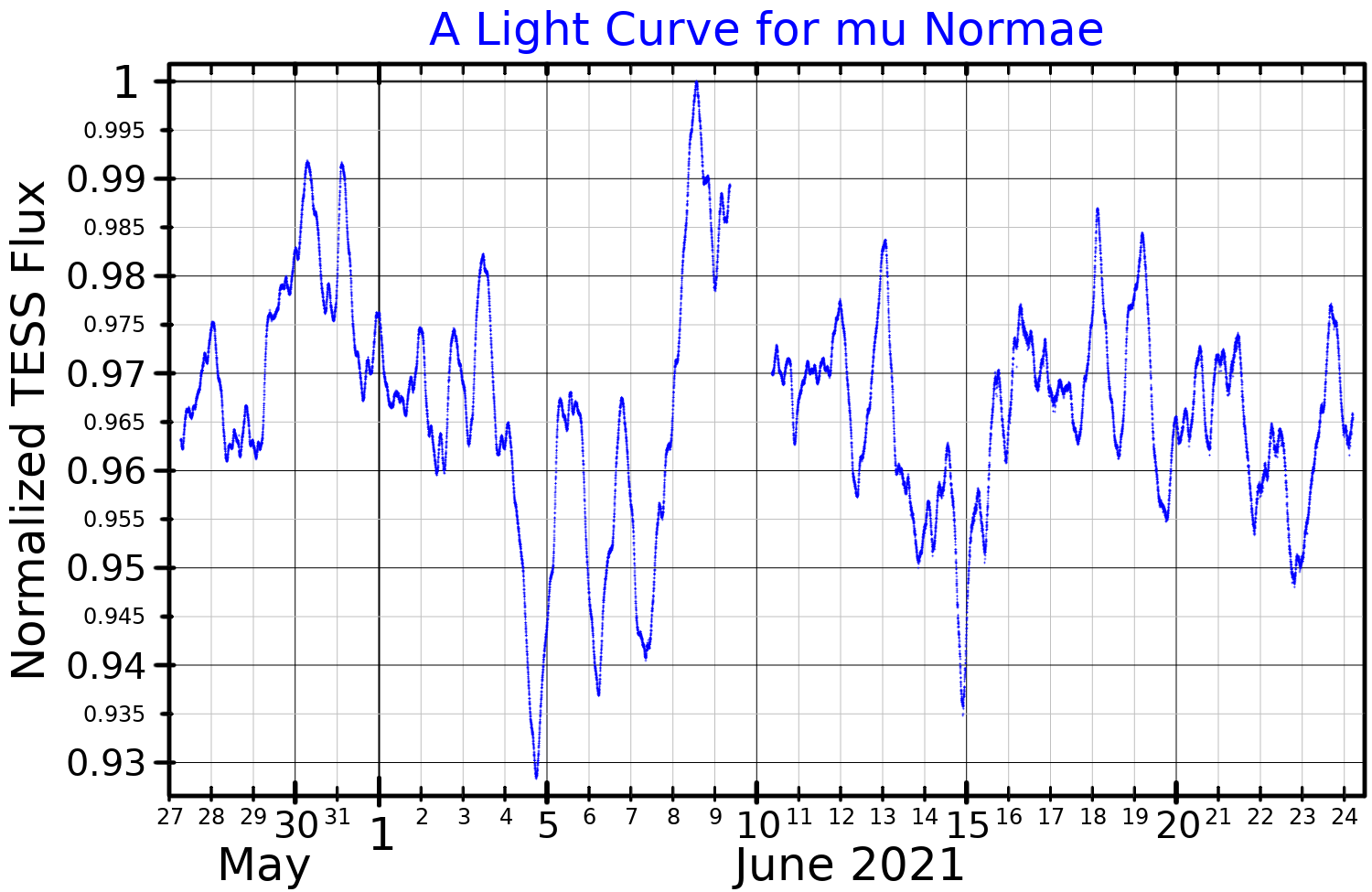
A light curve for Mu Normae, plotted from TESS data

It shines as bright as 339,000 Suns and weighs more than 30 solar masses. It varies in visual magnitude between 4.87 and 4.98, and is suspected of being an Alpha Cygni variable, which are named after Deneb.

It is in the same direction and at the same distance as the faint open cluster NGC 6169, although it is brighter than the combined magnitude of all the other stars in the cluster. It was considered the prototype of the μ Normae class of open clusters by Collinder.
