= NGC 6169 =

Star cluster in the constellation Norma

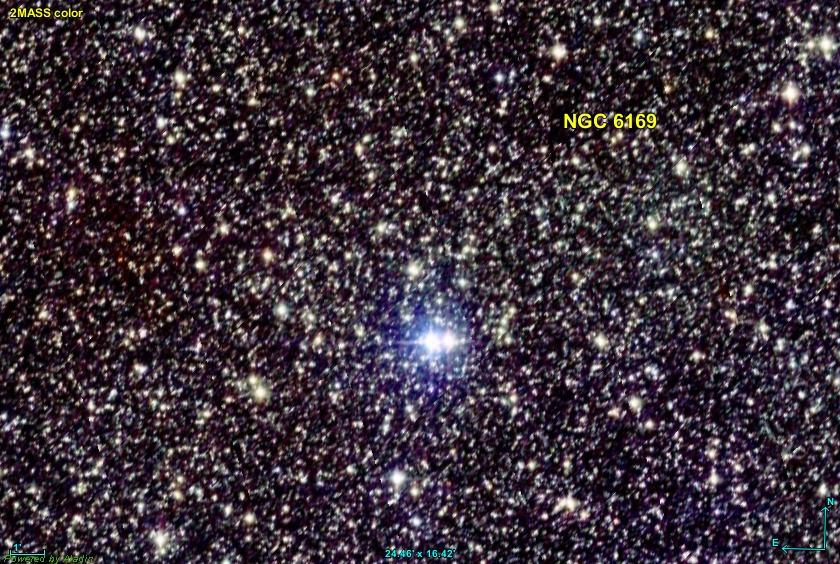
- NGC 6169 imaged by 2MASS

Observation data (J2000 epoch)
- Right ascension: 16^{h} 34^{m} 06.7^{s}
- Declination: −44° 00′ 58″
- Distance: 3280
- Apparent magnitude (V): 6.6

Physical characteristics
- Estimated age: 32 million years
- Other designations: Cr 306

Associations
- Constellation: Norma and Scorpius

NGC 6169 is an asterism or open cluster in the constellations Norma and Scorpius, appearing near the star Mu Normae in the sky. According to a 2013 catalog of open clusters, it is 3280 light-years distant and thought to be around 32 million years old, but according to a 2020 study using Gaia DR2 data, the stars are not physically associated.
