= NGC 2301 =

Open cluster in the constellation Monoceros

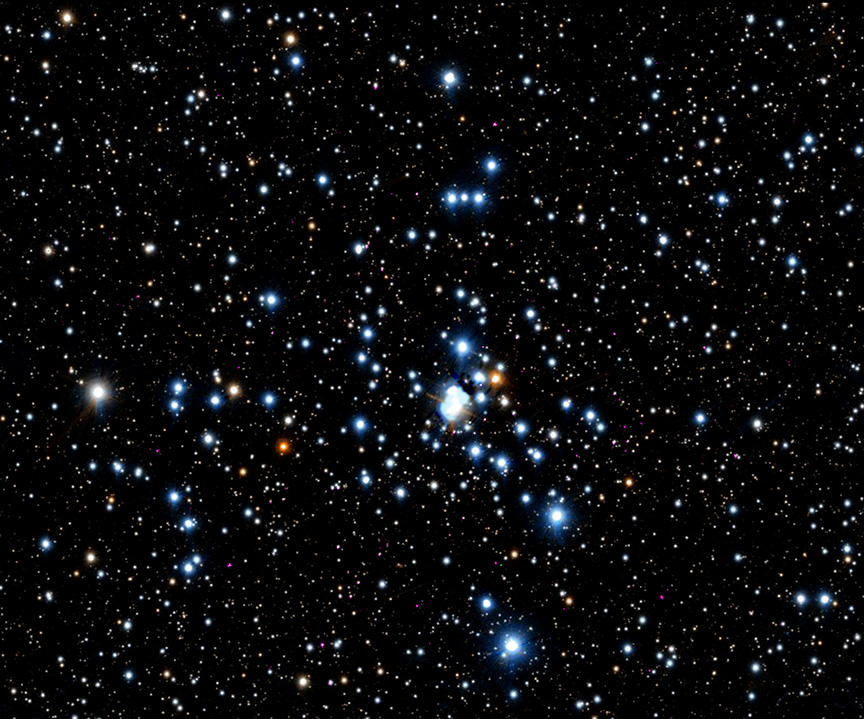
- NGC 2301 imaged by Chandra X-ray Observatory

Observation data (J2000 epoch)
- Right ascension: 06^{h} 51^{m} 45^{s}
- Declination: +00° 27′ 36″
- Distance: 2,840 ly (872 pc)
- Apparent magnitude (V): 6.0
- Apparent dimensions (V): 12′

Physical characteristics
- Estimated age: 165 million years old
- Other designations: Cr 119

Associations
- Constellation: Monoceros

NGC 2301, also known as Hagrid's Dragon, is an open cluster of stars in the constellation of Monoceros. It was discovered by German-English astronomer William Herschel in 1786. This formation is visible through 7x50 binoculars and it is considered the best open cluster for small telescopes in the constellation. It is located 5° WNW of Delta Monocerotis and 2° SSE of 18 Monocerotis. The brightest star of the cluster is an orange G8 subgiant star of 8.0 magnitude, but it is possible that it is a foreground star. The cluster contains also blue giants. The brightest main sequence star is a B9 star with magnitude 9.1.
