= VY Canis Majoris =

Star in the constellation Canis Major

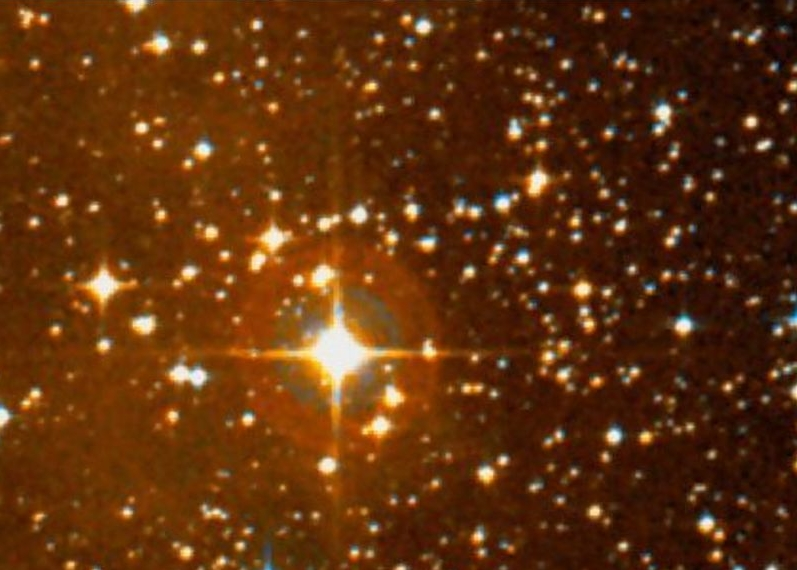
- VY Canis Majoris (brightest star in the image) and its surrounding molecular cloud complex Sh2-310; Credit: Rutherfurd Observatory/Columbia University

Observation data Epoch J2000.0 Equinox J2000.0
- Constellation: Canis Major
- Right ascension: 07^{h} 22^{m} 58.32877^{s}
- Declination: −25° 46′ 03.2355″
- Apparent magnitude (V): 6.5–9.6

Characteristics
- Evolutionary stage: RHG or ERSG (OH/IR)
- Spectral type: M3–M4.5 (M2.5–M5Iae, M7.0)
- Apparent magnitude (U): +12.01
- Apparent magnitude (B): +10.19
- Apparent magnitude (V): +7.95
- Apparent magnitude (J): +1.98
- Apparent magnitude (H): +0.44
- Apparent magnitude (K): −0.72
- U−B color index: +2.32
- B−V color index: +2.057
- V−R color index: +2.20
- Variable type: SRc or Lc

Astrometry
Radial velocity (R_{v})	+41 km/s
Proper motion (μ)	RA: −2.8±0.2 mas/yr Dec.: +2.6±0.2 mas/yr
Parallax (π)	0.83±0.08 mas
Distance	3,820+260 −230 ly (1,170+80 −70 pc)

Details
Mass	17±8 M_{☉}
Radius	1,420±120 R_{☉}
Luminosity	270,000±40,000, 178,000+40,900 −29,900 L_{☉}
Surface gravity (log g)	−0.6±0.4 cgs
Temperature	3,490±90 K
Metallicity [Fe/H]	+0.0 (Note: The given stellar metallicity is given as the solar metallicity ([Fe/H] = approx. +0.0 dex).) dex
Age	8.2 Myr

Other designations
- RAFGL 1111, VY CMa, AAVSO 0718−25, CD−25 4441, HD 58061, HIP 35793, SAO 173571, WDS J07230−2546AB, IRAS 07209−2540, IRC −30087, 2MASS J07225830−2546030

Database references
SIMBAD	data
- Location of VY CMa (circled in red)

VY Canis Majoris (abbreviated to VY CMa) is an extreme oxygen-rich red hypergiant or red supergiant (O-rich RHG or RSG) and pulsating variable star 1.2 kiloparsecs (3,900 light-years) from the Solar System in the slightly southern constellation of Canis Major. It is one of the largest known stars, one of the most luminous and massive red supergiants, and one of the most luminous stars in the Milky Way.

No current evidence has been found that it is part of a multiple-star system. Its great infrared (IR) excess makes it one of the brightest objects in the local part of the galaxy (Orion Arm) at wavelengths of 5 to 20 microns (μm) and indicates a dust shell or heated disk. It is about 17±8 times the mass of the Sun (M_{☉}), and is surrounded by a complex asymmetric circumstellar envelope (CSE) caused by its mass loss. It produces strong molecular maser emission and was one of the first radio masers discovered. VY CMa is embedded in the large molecular cloud Sh 2-310, a large, quite local star-forming H II region—its diameter: 480 arcminutes (′) or 681 ly (209 pc). It lies near the young open cluster NGC 2362, and is thought to be a member.

The radius of VY CMa is estimated at 1,420 times that of the Sun (R_{☉}), which is close to the modelled maximum, the Hayashi limit, corresponding to a volume almost 3 billion times that of the Sun. At this radius, an object travelling at the speed of light would take 6 hours to go around its surface, compared to 14.5 seconds for the Sun. If this star replaced the Sun, its surface would extend beyond the orbit of Jupiter. The star is usually compared to another similar star, NML Cygni, and has also been described as 'Betelgeuse on steroids'.

== Observational history ==
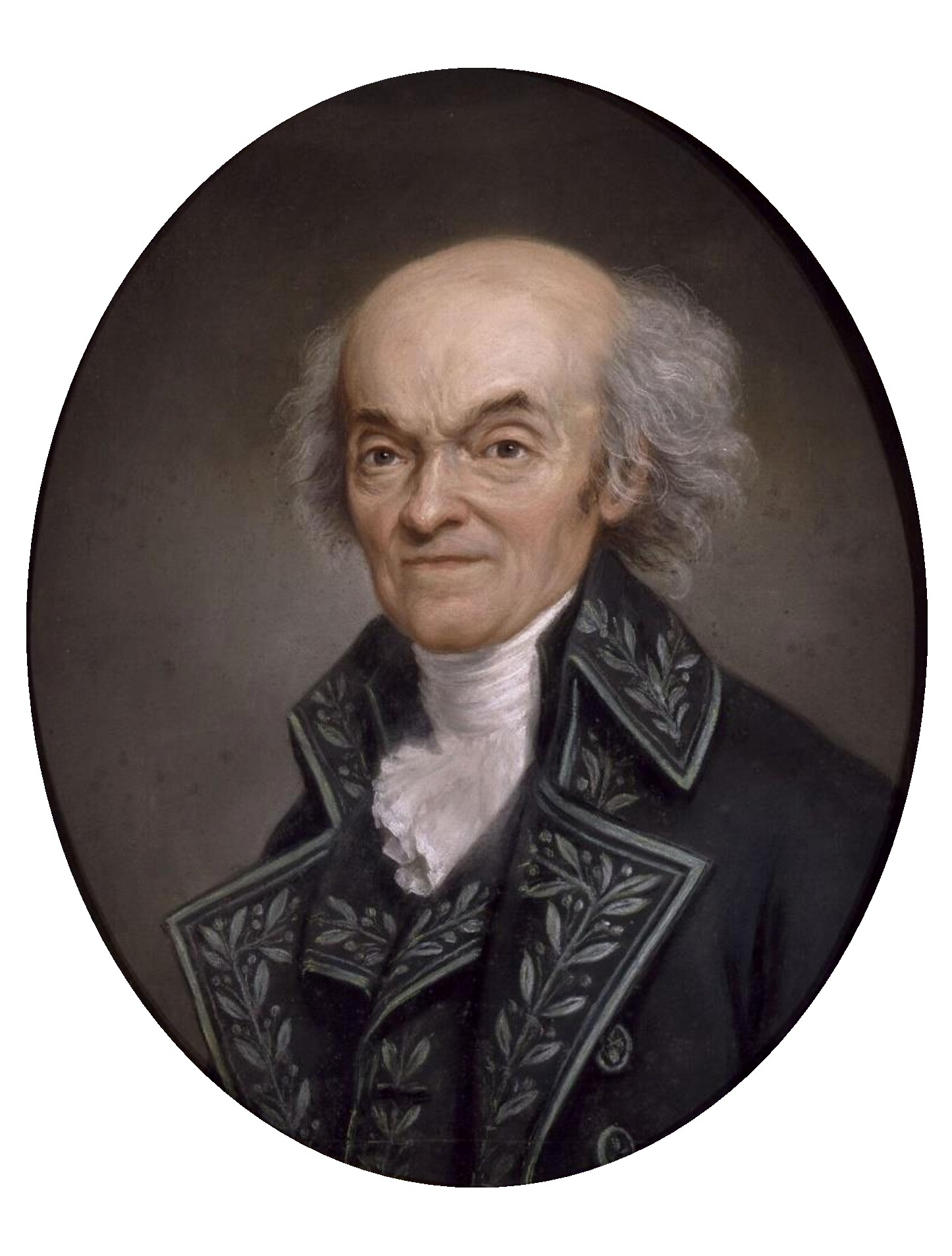
Portrait in bust of Jérôme Lalande in 1802

The first known-recorded observation of VY Canis Majoris is in the star catalogue of the French astronomer Jérôme Lalande in 1801, (Note: on 7 March) which lists it as a 7th order of magnitude star. Further quite frequent studies of its apparent magnitude imply the light of the star as viewed from Earth has faded since 1850, which could be due to emission changes or a denser part of its surrounds becoming interposed (extinction). Since 1847, VY Canis Majoris has been described as a crimson star. During the 19th century, observers measured at least six discrete components, suggesting that it might be a multiple star. These are now known to be bright zones in the host nebula. Observations in 1957 and high-resolution imaging in 1998 all but rule out any companion stars.

Giving spectral lines in brackets, the star is a strong emitter of OH (1612 MHz), H_{2}O (22235.08 MHz), and SiO (43122 MHz) masers, which has been proven to be typical of an OH/IR star. Molecules, such as HCN, NaCl, PN, CH, CO, CH_{3}OH, TiO, and TiO_{2} have been detected.

The variation in the star's brightness was first described in 1931, when it was listed (in German) as a long-period variable with a photographic magnitude range of 9.5 to 11.5. It was given the variable star designation VY Canis Majoris in 1939, the 43rd variable star of the constellation Canis Major.

Combining data from the mentioned telescope with others from the Keck in Hawaii it was possible to make a three-dimensional reconstruction of the envelope of the star. This reconstruction showed that the star's mass loss is much more complex than expected for any red supergiant or hypergiant. It became clear that the bows and nodules appeared at different times; the jets are randomly oriented, which prompts suspicion they derive from explosions of active parts of the photosphere. The spectroscopy proves the jets move away from the star at different speeds, confirming multiple events and directions as with coronal mass ejections. Multiple asymmetric mass loss events and the ejection of the outermost material are deduced to have occurred within the last 500 to 1,000 years, while that of a knot near the star would be less than 100 years. The mass loss is due to strong convection in the tenuous outer layers of the star, associated with magnetic fields. Ejections are analogous to—but much larger than—coronal ejections of the Sun.

== Distance ==
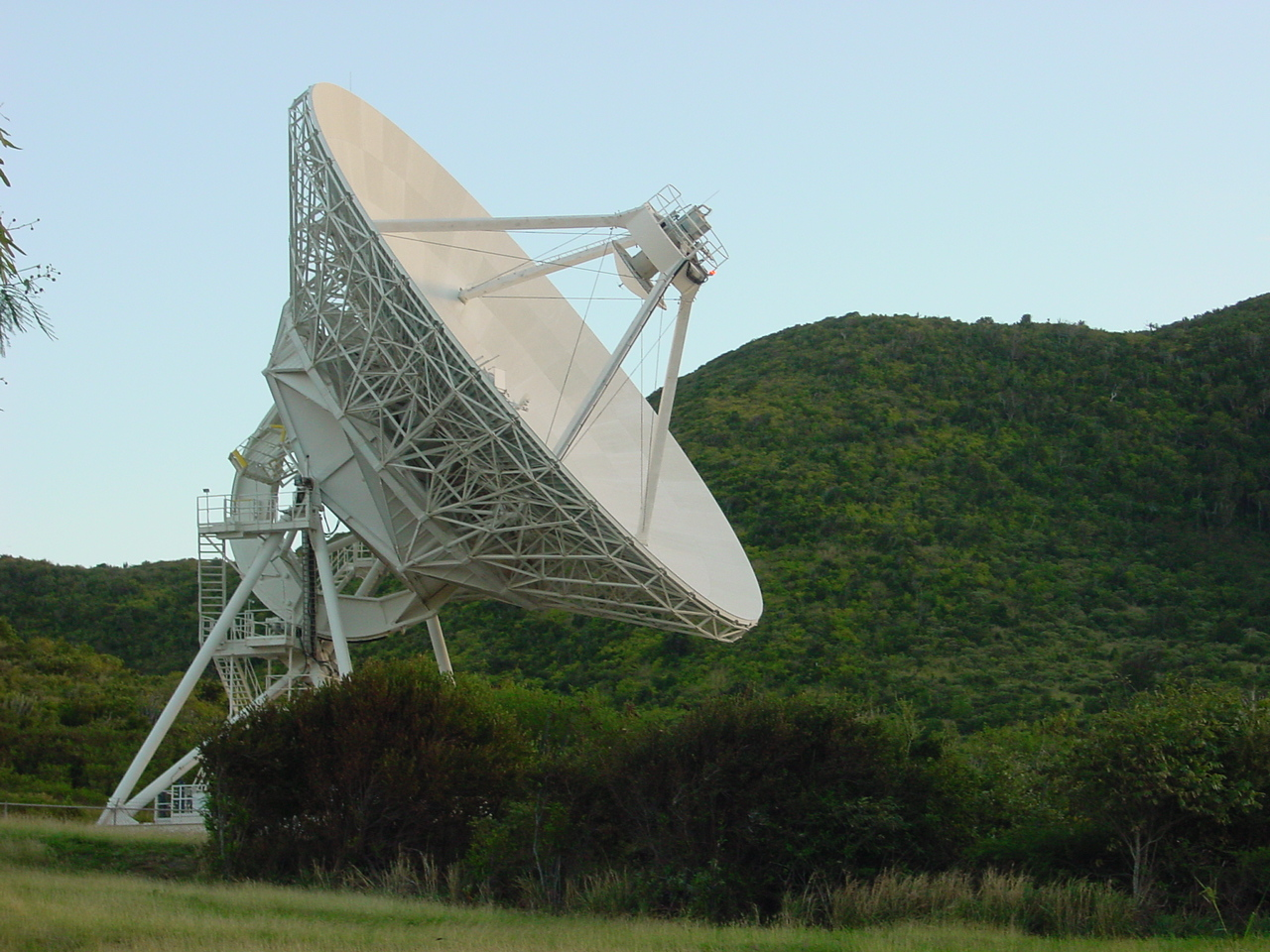
VLBA used to derive VY CMa's 2011 distance estimate

In 1976, Lada and Reid (Note: Charles J. Lada and Mark J. Reid) published observations of the bright-rimmed molecular cloud Sh 2-310, which is 15″ east of the star. They assumed the cloud is associated with the open cluster NGC 2362 based on the cloud rim's ionization. NGC 2362 could be anywhere in the ranges of 1.5±0.5 kiloparsecs (kpc) or 4,890±1,630 light-years (ly) away as determined from its color-magnitude diagram. VY CMa is projected onto the tip of the cloud rim, strongly suggesting its association. Furthermore, all the vectors of velocity of Sh 2-310 are very close to those of the star. There is thus a near-certain physical association of the star with Sh 2-310 and with NGC 2362 in all standard models. Melnik and others later prefer a range centred on 1.2 kiloparsecs (about 3,900 light-years).

Distance can be more directly measured via stellar parallax; however, this star has a small parallax due to its distance, and standard visual observations have a margin of error too large for a hypergiant star with an extended CSE to be useful. For example, the Hipparcos Catalogue of 1997 gives a purely notional parallax of 1.78±3.54 milliarcseconds (mas), and Gaia DR2 gives a purely notional parallax of −5.92±0.83 mas.

In some cases, radio parallax (via long baseline interferometry) can be useful. For VY CMa this was achieved in 2008, with observations of H_{2}O masers using VERA interferometry from the National Astronomical Observatory of Japan giving a parallax of 0.88±0.08 mas, corresponding to a distance of 1.14+0.11
−0.09 kpc (about 3,720+360
−300 ly). In 2012, observations of SiO masers using very-long-baseline interferometry (VLBI) from Very Long Baseline Array (VLBA) independently derived a parallax of 0.83±0.08 mas, corresponding to a distance of 1.20+0.13
−0.10 kpc (about 3,910+423
−326 ly). These imply the cloud (Sh 2-310) is less remote than thought or that VY CMa is a foreground object.

== Spectrum ==
The spectrum of VY Canis Majoris is that of a high-luminosity M-class star. The hydrogen lines, however, have P Cygni profiles fit for luminous blue variables (LBVs). The spectrum is dominated by TiO bands whose strengths suggest a classification of M5, while another class as late as M7.0 has been based on the VO spectrum, highly unusual for a supergiant and similar to other very late-type OH/IR red supergiants such as MY Cephei, S Persei, VX Sagittarii, and NML Cygni. Such stars were also referred to as "S Per et al.". The H-alpha (H_{α}) line is not visible yet and there are unusual emission lines of neutral elements such as sodium and calcium. The luminosity class, as determined from different spectral features, varies from bright giant (II) to bright supergiant (Ia), with a compromise being given: as M5eIbp. Old classifications were confused by the interpretation of surrounding nebulosity as companion stars.

The present spectral classification system is inadequate for this star's complexities. The class depends on which of its complex spectral features are stressed. Further, key facets vary over time for this star. It is cooler and thus redder than M2, and is usually classified between M3 and M5. A class as extreme as M2.5 appeared in a study from 2006. The luminosity class is likewise confused and often given only as I, partly because luminosity classes are poorly defined in the red and infrared portions of the spectrum. One study, though, gives a luminosity class of Ia^{+}, which means a hypergiant or extremely luminous supergiant.

== Variability ==
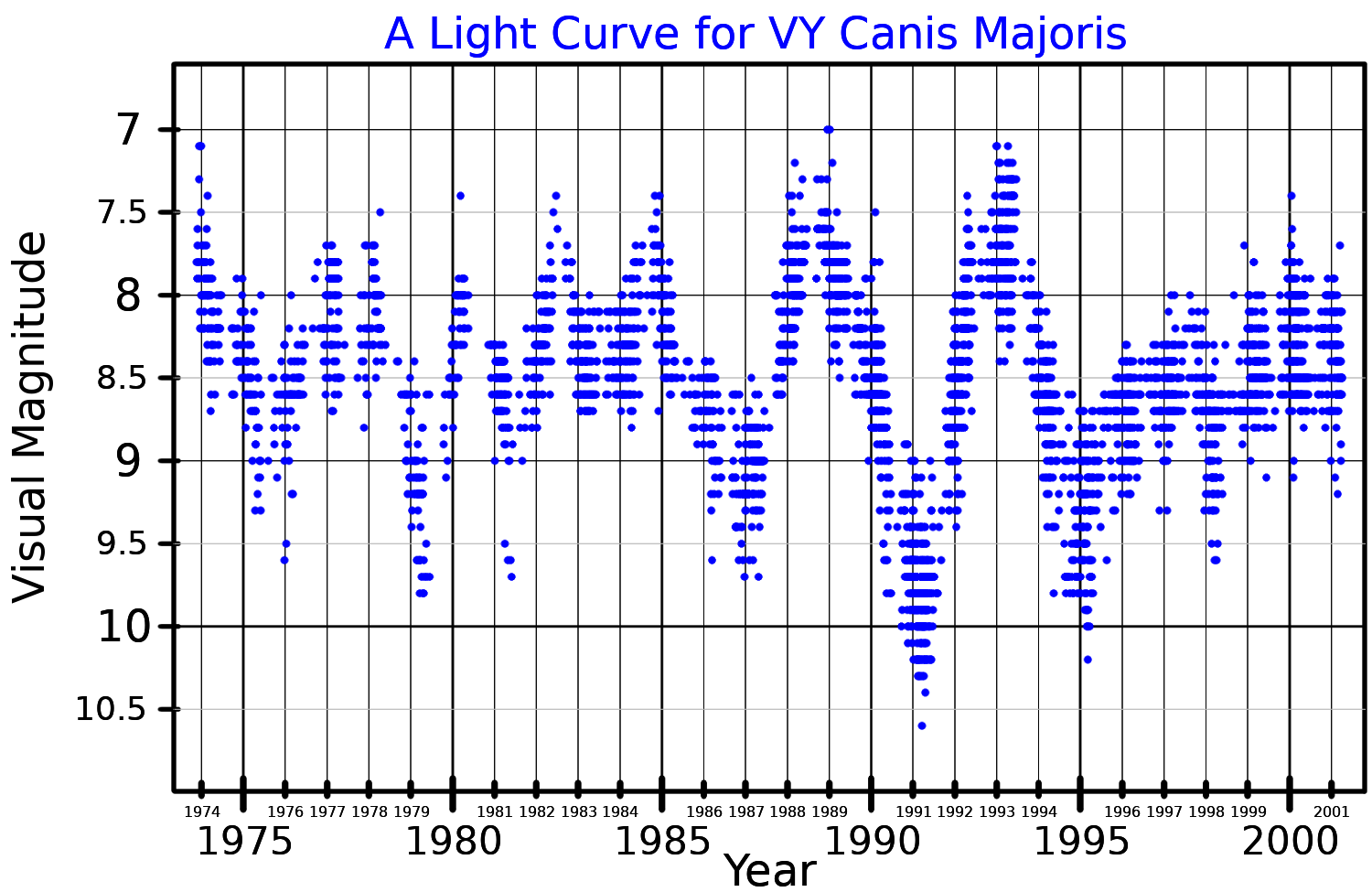
A visual band light curve for VY Canis Majoris, from AAVSO data

VY Canis Majoris is a variable star that varies from an apparent visual magnitude of 9.6 at minimum brightness to a magnitude of 6.5 at maximum with an estimated pulsational period of 956 days. In the General Catalogue of Variable Stars (GCVS) it is classed a semiregular variable of sub-type SRc, indicating a cool supergiant, although it is classed as a type LC slow irregular variable star in the American Association of Variable Star Observers (AAVSO) Variable Star Index. Other periods of 1,600 and 2,200 days have been derived.

VY CMa is also sometimes considered the prototype for a class of heavily mass-losing OH/IR supergiants, distinct from the more common asymptotic giant branch OH/IR stars.

== Physical properties ==
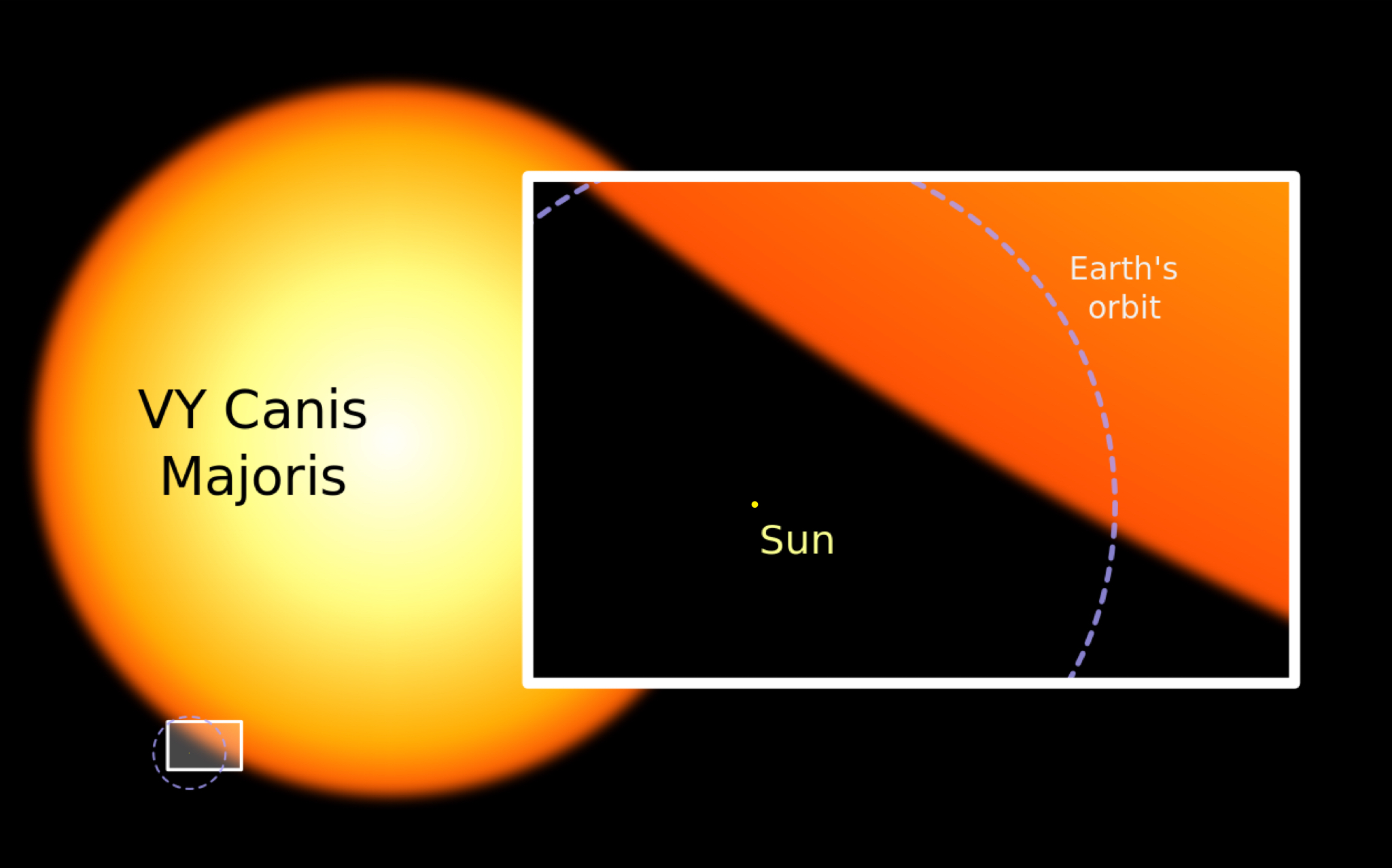
VY Canis Majoris compared to the Sun and the Earth's orbit

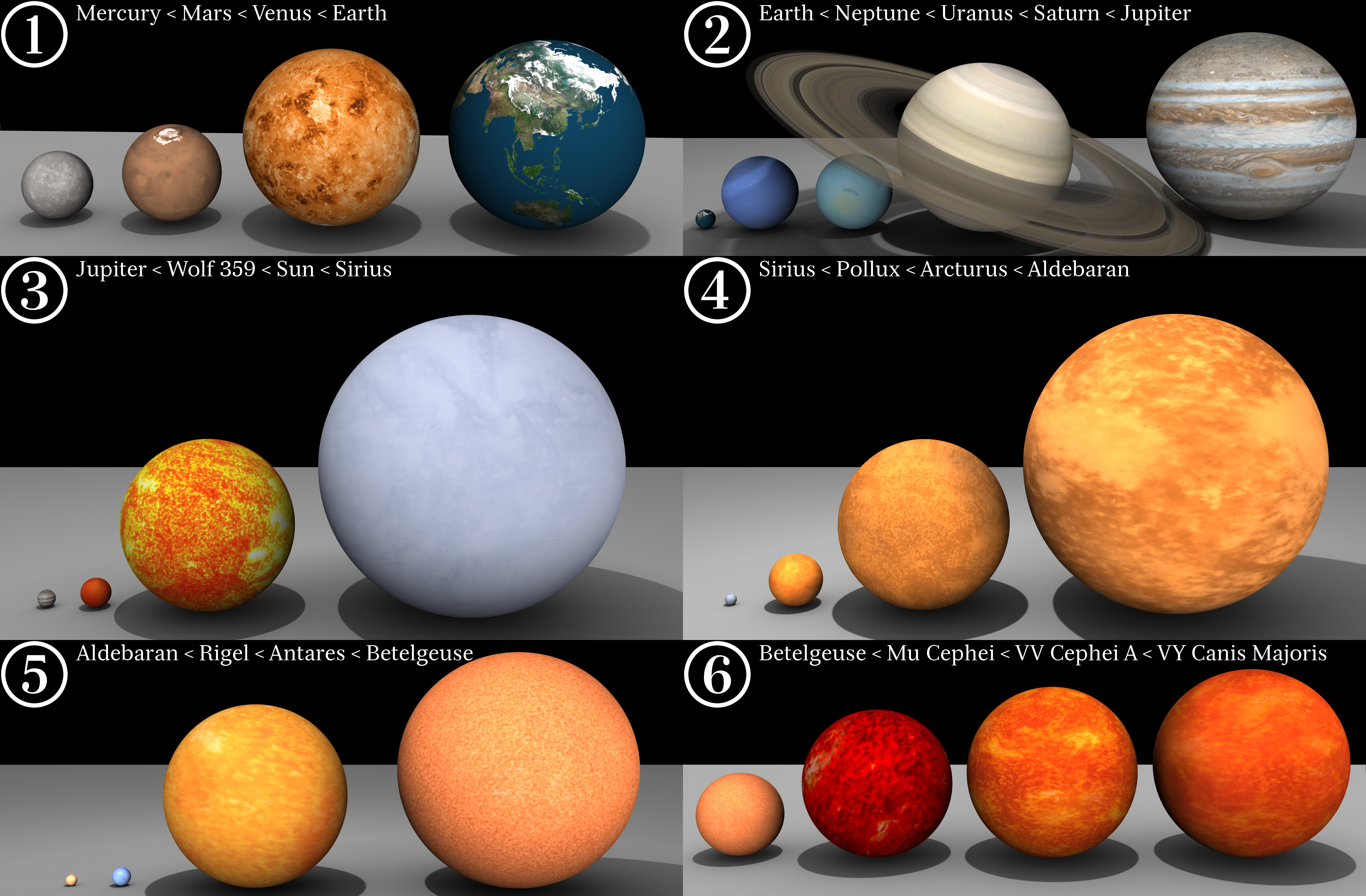
(July 2008, outdated). Relative sizes of the planets in the Solar System and several stars, including VY Canis Majoris: 1. Mercury < Mars < Venus < Earth; 2. Earth < Neptune < Uranus < Saturn < Jupiter; 3. Jupiter < Wolf 359 < Sun < Sirius; 4. Sirius < Pollux < Arcturus < Aldebaran; 5. Aldebaran < Rigel < Antares < Betelgeuse; 6. Betelgeuse < Mu Cephei < VV Cephei A < VY Canis Majoris.

A very large and luminous star, VY Canis Majoris has been known to be an extreme object since the middle of the 20th century (among the most extreme stars in the Milky Way), although its true nature was uncertain. Its most analogous star is NML Cygni, another notable but less studied extreme cool hypergiant star within the constellation Cygnus.

In the late 20th century, it was accepted that the star was a post-main-sequence red supergiant, occupying the upper-right-hand corner of the Hertzsprung–Russell diagram (HR diagram) despite the uncertainty of its exact luminosity and temperature. Its angular diameter was measured and found to be significantly different depending on the observed wavelength. Most of the properties of the star depend directly on its distance, but the first meaningful estimates of its properties showed a very large star.

=== Luminosity ===
The bolometric luminosity (L_{bol}) of VY CMa can be calculated from spectral energy distribution or bolometric flux, which can be determined from photometry in several visible and infrared bands. Earlier calculations of the luminosity based on an assumed distance of 1.5 kpc gave luminosities between 200,000 and 560,000 times the Sun's luminosity (L_{☉}), considerably very close or beyond the empirical Humphreys–Davidson limit. One study gave nearly one million L_{☉} at a distance of 2.1 kpc (6.8 kly). In 2006 a luminosity of 430,000 L_{☉} was calculated by integrating the total fluxes over the entire nebula since most of the radiation coming from the star is reprocessed by the dust in the surrounding cloud.

Modern estimates of the luminosity extrapolate values below 350,000 L_{☉} based on distances below 1.2 kpc, with a 2011 value calculated to be 270,000±40,000 L_{☉} based on a 2001 photometry. More recently, a lower luminosity of 178,000+40,900
−29,900 L_{☉}was derived in 2020 based on more recent photometry at more wavelengths to estimate the bolometric flux. Many older luminosity estimates are consistent with current ones if they are rescaled to the distance of 1.2 kpc.

Despite being one of the most luminous stars in the Milky Way, much of the visible light of VY CMa is absorbed by the circumstellar envelope, so the star needs a telescope to be observed. Removing its envelope, the star would be one for the naked eye. Most of the output of VY CMa is emitted as infrared radiation, with a maximum emission at 5–10 μm, which is in part caused by reprocessing of the radiation by the circumstellar nebula.

=== Mass ===
Since this star has no confirmed companion star, its mass cannot be measured directly through gravitational interactions. Comparison of the effective temperature and bolometric luminosity compared to evolutionary tracks for massive stars suggests:

- if a rotating star, an initial mass of 25±10 M_{☉} but current mass 15 M_{☉} and an age of 8.2 million years (Myr); or
- if non-rotating, 32 M_{☉} initially, falling to present-day 19 M_{☉}.

Older studies have found much higher initial masses (thus also higher current masses), such as a progenitor mass of 40–60 M_{☉} based on old luminosity estimates.

=== Mass loss ===
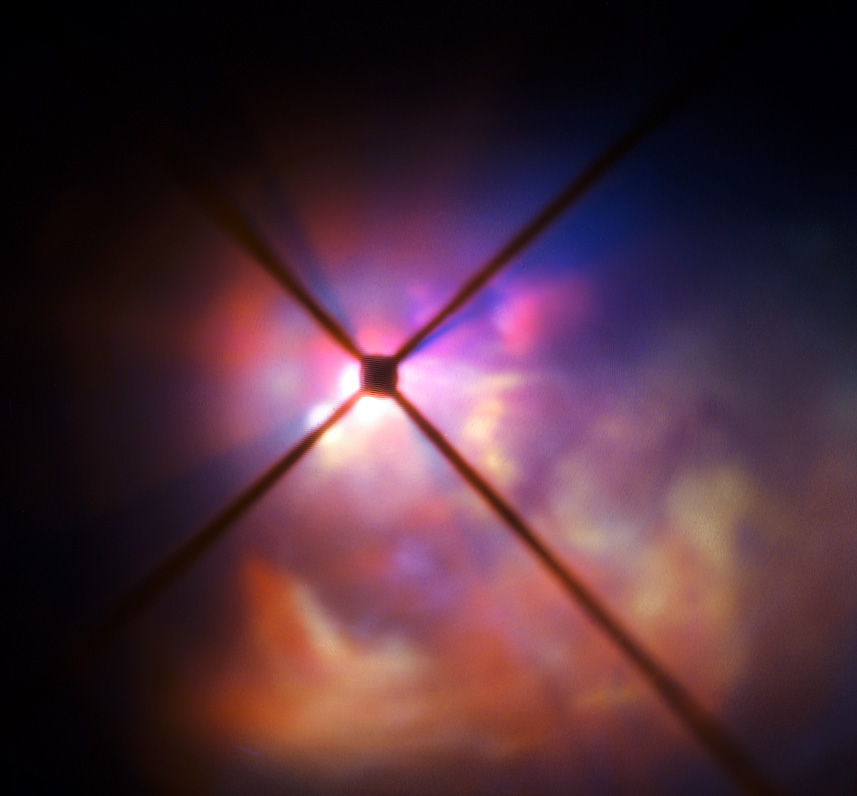
Image taken by the ESO's Very Large Telescope showing the asymmetric nebula around VY CMa using SPHERE instrument. The star itself is hidden behind a dark disk. Crosses are artifacts (lens effects) due to the characteristics of the instrument.

VY CMa has a strong stellar wind and is losing much material due to its high luminosity and quite low surface gravity. It has an average mass loss rate of (5.6±0.6)×10^{−4} M_{☉} per year, among the highest known and unusually high even for a red supergiant, as evidenced by its extensive envelope. It is thus an exponent for the understanding of high-mass loss episodes near the end of massive star evolution. The mass loss rate probably exceeded 10^{−3} M_{☉}/yr during the greatest mass loss events.

The star has produced large, probably convection-driven, mass-loss events 70, 120, 200, and 250 years ago. The clump shed by the star between 1985 and 1995 is the source of its hydroxyl maser emission.

=== Temperature ===
The effective temperature of this star is uncertain, although its temperature is well below 4,000 K (3,730 °C; 6,740 °F). Some signature changes in its spectrum correspond to temperature variations. Early estimates of the mean temperature assumed values below 3,000 kelvin (K) based on a spectral class of M5. In 2006, its temperature was calculated to be as high as 3,650±25 K, corresponding to a spectral class of M2.5, yet this star is usually considered as an M4 to M5 star. Adopting the latter classes with the temperature scale proposed by Emily Levesque gives a range of between 3,450 and 3,535 K.

=== Size ===
Right to left: VY Canis Majoris compared to Betelgeuse, Rho Cassiopeiae, the Pistol Star, and the Sun (too small to be visible in this thumbnail). The orbits of Jupiter and Neptune are also shown.

The calculation of the radius of VY CMa is complicated by the extensive circumstellar envelope of the star. VY CMa is also a pulsating star, so its size changes with time. Early direct measurements of the radius at infrared (K-band = 2.2 μm) wavelength gave an angular diameter of 18.7±0.5 mas, corresponding to radii above 3,000 R_{☉} (2.1×10^{9} km; 14 au; 1.3×10^{9} mi) at a still very plausible distance of 1.5 kpc; a radius considerably dwarfing other known red supergiants or hypergiants. However, this is probably larger than the actual size of the underlying star; this angular diameter estimate is heightened from interference by the envelope. In 2006–07, another paper published a size estimate of 1,800–2,100 R_{☉} and concluded that VY CMa is a true hypergiant. This uses the latter well-reviewed effective temperature 3,450–3,535 K, and a preferred luminosity of 430,000 L_{☉} based on SED integration and still the same distance.

In 2011, (Note: On 6 and 7 March) the star was studied at near-infrared wavelengths using interferometry at the Very Large Telescope. The published size of the star was based on its Rosseland radius, a distance where the optical depth is 2/3, the same condition used to measure the solar radius. The team derived an angular diameter of 11.3±0.3 mas which, at an averaged distance of 1.17 ± 0.08 kpc (3.82 ± 0.26 kly), resulted in a radius of 1,420±120 R_{☉}. The high spectral resolution of these observations allowed the effects of contamination by circumstellar layers to be minimised. An effective temperature of 3,490±90 K, corresponding to a spectral class of M4, was then derived from the radius and a measured flux of (6.3±0.3)×10^{−13} W/cm^{2}. Although well determined, the authors stated a possibility of the angular diameter, hence the photospheric radius, being slightly overestimated (on the order of 1 sigma). If overestimated, it would also imply a higher temperature.

A 2013 estimate based on the Wittkowski radius and the Monnier radius put mean size at 2,000 R_{☉}, and later that year, Matsuura and others put forward a competing method of finding radius within the envelope, putting the star at 2,069 R_{☉}, based on a cool-end of estimates adopted temperature of 2,800 K and a luminosity of 237,000 L_{☉}. However, these values are not consistent with its spectral types, leaving the 2012 values in better match.

Most such radius estimates are considered as the size for the mean limit of the optical photosphere while the size of the star for the radio photosphere is calculated to be twice that.

==== Largest star ====
VY Canis Majoris has been historically recognized to have various estimates that would suggest the star (along with a few other peculiar red supergiants, such as notably VV Cephei A and NML Cygni) would be considerably more luminous, cooler, and therefore much larger than other known red supergiants, with sizes in excess of 1,800 R_{☉} and even above 3,000 R_{☉}. This would place the star outside the bounds of current stellar evolutionary theory, beyond the maximum predicted size and luminosity for the most luminous and largest red supergiants and other massive stars (at least maintening hydrostatic equilibrium), which are consistent with the radii values of 1,500 R_{☉} given for the four largest galactic red supergiants per a survey, including Mu Cephei and V354 Cephei, along with later the extragalactic star, WOH G64 A, which used to have also comparable extreme properties before 2008.

In contrast to the prevailing opinion of the star's status as an extremely luminous red supergiant, a 2006 study, ignoring the effects of the circumstellar envelope in the observed flux of the star, derived a luminosity of 60,000 L_{☉}, suggesting an initial mass of 15 M_{☉} and radius of 600 R_{☉} based on an assumed effective temperature of 3,650 K and the same distance. On this basis, they considered both VY CMa and NML Cyg as normal early-type red supergiants. They assert that earlier very high luminosities of 500,000 L_{☉} and very large radii of 2,800–3,230 R_{☉} (up to 4,000 R_{☉}) were based on effective temperatures below 3,000 K that were unreasonably low, as it would place the star inside the Hayashi forbidden zone, where stars cannot be in hydrostatic equilibrium. Those values have been ruled out almost immediately by another paper that published the 1,800–2,100 R_{☉} estimate, which suggests the star is undoubtedly in a non-equilibrium state, evidenced by the star's extreme mass loss rates and its circumstellar envelope.

With the size of those said stars calculated more accurately to be somewhat lower later, for example 1,420 R_{☉} for VY CMa in 2012, this leaves few other galactic and extragalactic red supergiants (and hypergiants) with comparable estimates (such as Westerlund 1 W26 and WOH G64 A) and even larger sizes once published and in-date, such as notably UY Scuti and Stephenson 2 DFK 1. Despite this, VY Canis Majoris is still occasionally described as the largest known star at least well-characterised, and as well as the most luminous and the initially most massive red supergiant known, sometimes with caveats to account for the highly uncertain sizes of all these stars. (Note: Alcolea et al 2013 refer to VY CMa as having the highest radius "among well-characterised stars in our galaxy", referring to the Wittkowski et al. 2012 value of 1,420 R_{☉} which is based on the distances from Choi et al. 2008 and Zhang et al. 2012 plus an angular diameter. Several red supergiants (or hypergiants) are possibly larger, although they could have less accurate radius estimates.)

== Surroundings ==
=== Circumstellar nebula ===
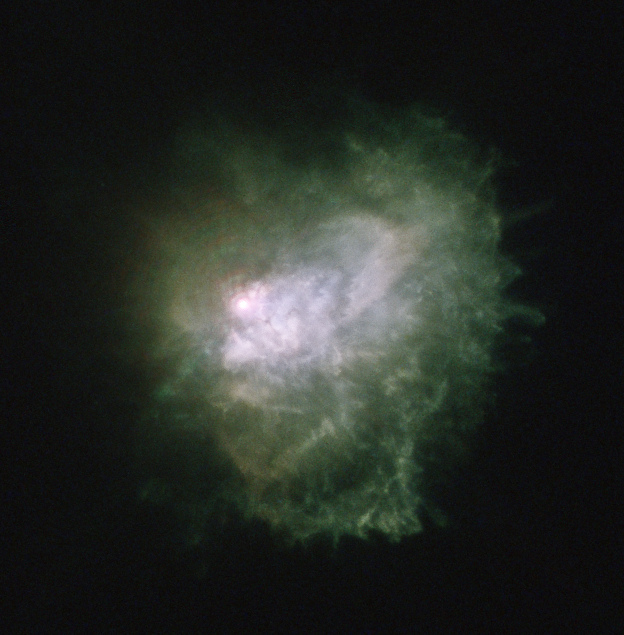
WFPC2/HST image showing the asymmetric nebula surrounding VY CMa, which is the central star

VY Canis Majoris is surrounded by an extensive and dense asymmetric red reflection nebula, with a total ejected mass of 0.2–0.4 M_{☉} and a temperature of 800 K, based on a DUSTY model atmosphere that has been formed by material expelled from its central star. The inner shell figures as 0.12″ across, corresponding to 140 AU (0.0022 ly) for a star 1,200 parsecs away, whereas that of the outer one is at 10″, corresponding to 12,000 AU (0.19 ly). This nebula is so bright that it was discovered in a dry night sky in 1917 with an 18 cm telescope, and its condensations were once regarded as companion stars. It has been extensively studied with the aid of the Hubble Space Telescope (HST), showing that the nebula has a complex structure that includes filaments and arcs, which were caused by past eruptions; the structure is akin to that around the post-red supergiant yellow hypergiant (Post-RSG YHG) IRC +10420. The similarity has led studies proposing that VY CMa might evolve blueward. Furthermore, the gas-to-dust ratio for VY CMa was calculated to be as high as 500, around five times that for typical red supergiants.

==== Activity ====
Six outflows or ejecta from VY Canis Majoris have been identified during its last 25-year active period, having started about 100 years ago. As such, it would have entered its presently observed active phase with relatively frequent massive outflows about 1,200 years ago. Though no explanation has been made regarding its onset, the star's enhanced surface activity may have been stimulated by a change in the interior, probably in the structure of the convective layers. The total mass shed during this active period by the four observed knots and clumps is over 0.05 M_{☉}, yielding an effective mass loss rate of at least 10^{−3} M_{☉}/yr within 30 years, assuming 10^{−2} M_{☉} for knots W1 A and W1 B. The mass lost in these discrete episodes dominates VY CMa's recent mass loss history and explains its high mass loss rate.

Although the record of VY CMa is atypical, other surface outflows have been observed recently in Betelgeuse and the possible post-RSG K-type hypergiant, RW Cephei. The mass loss value estimates from the recent dimming of both of those stars show that high mass surface outflows in cool supergiants are more common and significantly contribute to their mass loss.

=== Interstellar neighborhood ===
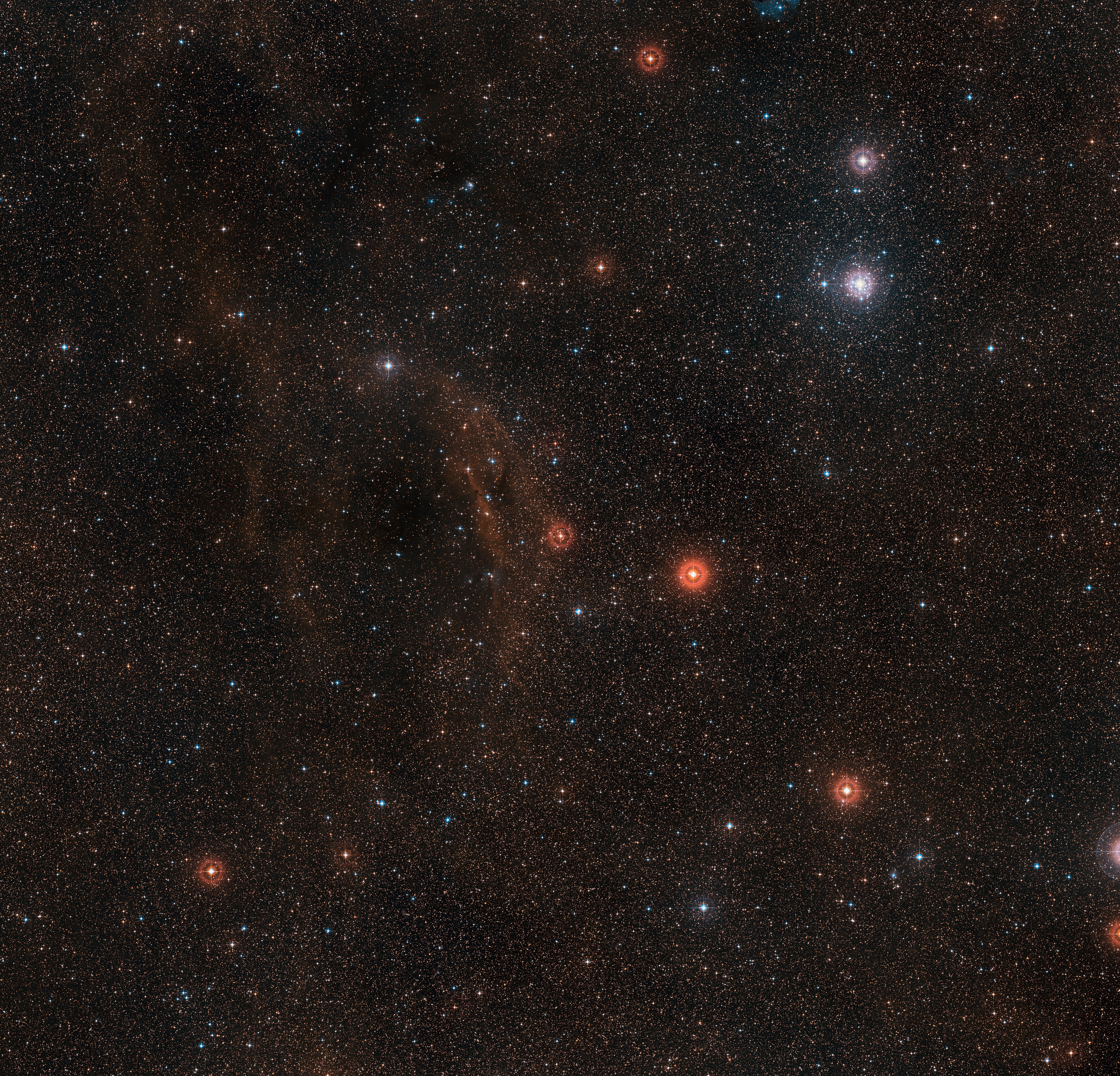
Combined optical and infrared image of VY CMa (centre) and Sh 2-310. The bright star at the upper right is τ Canis Majoris. (ESO/Digitized Sky Survey 2)

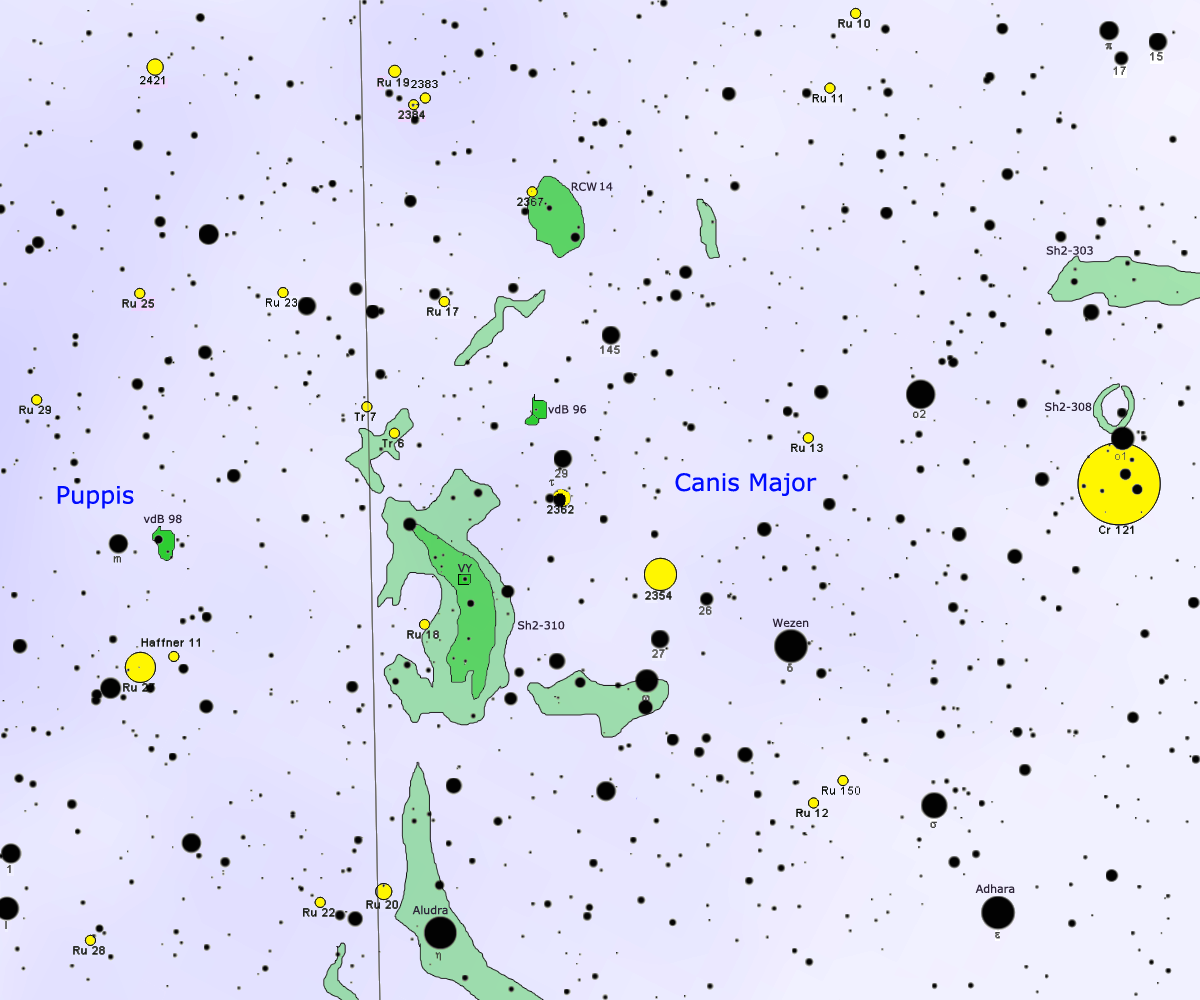
Map of the giant molecular cloud Sh 2-310 and its surroundings

In 1976, Lada and Reid (Note: Charles J. Lada and Mark J. Reid) published observations of the bright-rimmed molecular cloud Sh 2-310, which is 15″ east of the star. At its edge bordered by the bright rim, an abrupt decrease in the CO emission and an increase in brightness of the ^{12}CO emission were observed, indicating possible destruction of molecular material and enhanced heating at the cloud-rim interface, respectively. They assumed the distance of the cloud is approximately equal to that of the stars, which are members of the open cluster NGC 2362, that ionize the rim. This star is projected onto the tip of the cloud rim, strongly suggesting its association. Furthermore, all the vectors of velocity of Sh 2-310 are very close to those of the star. There is thus a near-certain physical association of the star with Sh 2-310 and with NGC 2362 in all standard models.

Sh 2-310 besides containing VY Canis Majoris and NGC 2362 also is host to the dark nebulae, LDN 1660, LDN 1664, and LDN 1667. Sh 2-310 is also host to the stars Tau Canis Majoris which is the brightest member of NGC 2362, UW Canis Majoris and HD 58011 which along with VY Canis Majoris are thought to be probable sources of ionization of gases in Sh 2-310. Sh 2-310 itself is located on the outer edge of the Orion Arm of the Milky Way.

== Evolution ==
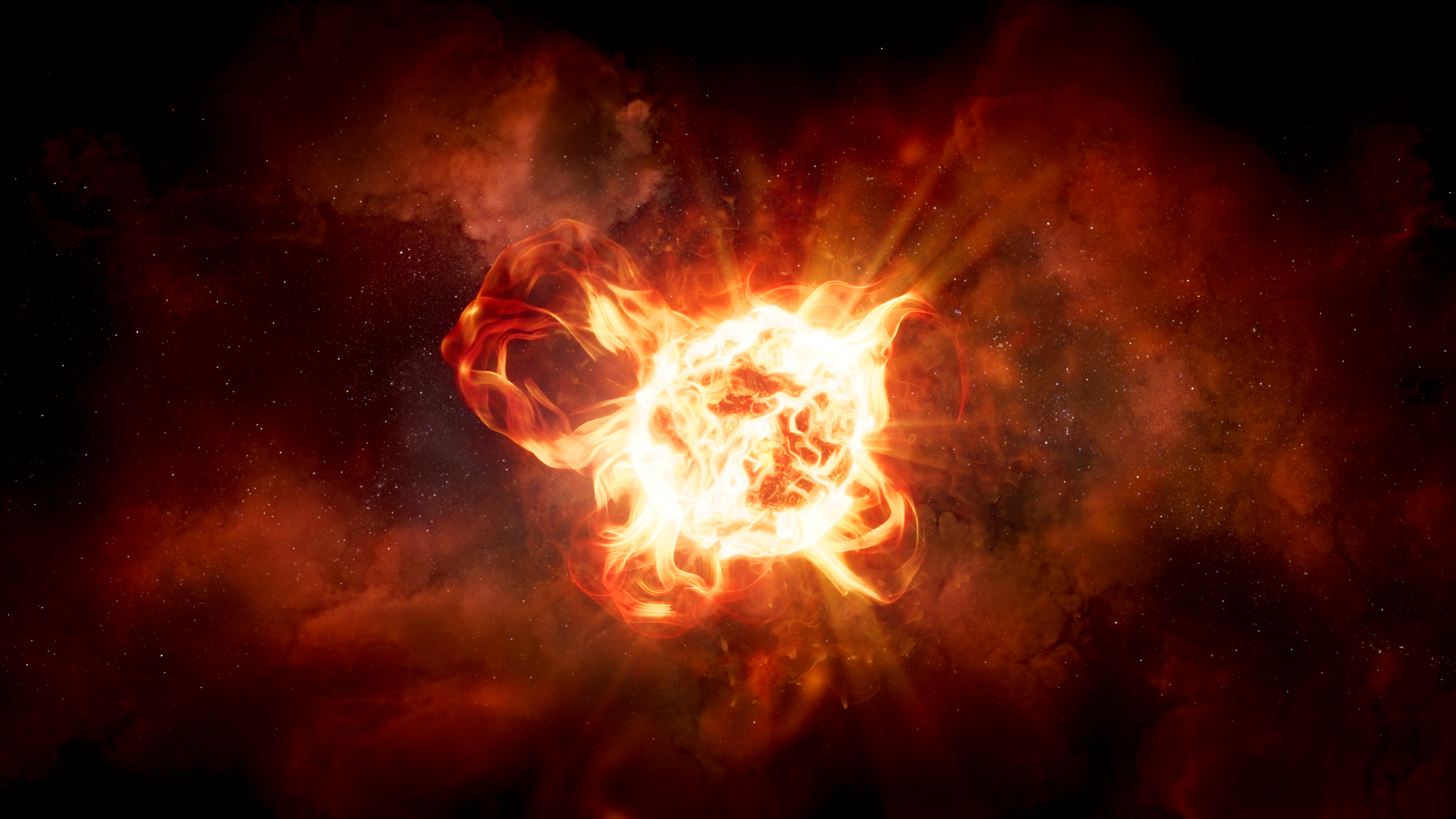
Artistic representation of VY Canis Majoris

VY Canis Majoris is a highly evolved star yet less than 10 million years old (Myr), having probably evolved from a hot, dense O9 main sequence star of 5 R_{☉}. The star has evolved rapidly because of its high mass, and it has begun to fuse helium into carbon en masse. (Note: a main sequence star fuses hydrogen into helium.) The time spent in the red hypergiant phase is estimated to be between 100,000 and 500,000 years, and thus, VY CMa most likely left its main sequence phase more than a million years ago. Few early researchers envisaged the star as a very young protostar or a massive pre-main-sequence star with an age of only 1 Myr and typically a circumstellar disk.

As VY CMa is very unstable and has a prodigious mass loss, such as in ejections, its future evolution remains uncertain. However, like most cool supergiants, the mass loss events may determine the final fate of the star, whether as supernovae or direct collapse to a black hole. It is one of the most important evolved massive stars for understanding the role of high mass loss episodes on the final stages of the most massive stars that passed through the red supergiant phase. The star was also known to have a unique, rich, and peculiar chemistry with 25 molecules identified in its ejecta, with 21 among them in common with NML Cygni. Primary ^{12}C to ^{13}C ratios in various structures in the ejecta are significantly higher than those measured in oxygen-rich red giants and supergiants, and may be indicators of additional dredge-up, possibly related to the star's surface activity. More clues about the current state and fate of the star may be provided by the ratios' association with separate outflows, arcs, and clumps at different locations, and with expansion ages.

=== Supernova ===
VY CMa was widely expected to explode as a supernova (SN) within the next 100,000 years. However, the star formed with an initial mass well beyond the 18 M_{☉} upper mass for the progenitors of the Type IIP supernovae, and the complex structure around it bears similarity to that around the post-red supergiant IRC +10420. As such, it may evolve blueward on the HR diagram first to become a yellow hypergiant, then a luminous blue variable, and finally a Wolf–Rayet star (WR star). Per models for the stellar structure, this would require enough mass loss to increase the ratio of the He/C core relative to the total stellar mass to send the star on a blue loop. In 2022, researchers concluded that progenitor stars of the three superluminous supernovae (SLSNe), including PS15br, SN 2017ens, and SN 2017err, likely had extreme mass-losses before exploding. Thus, they implied SN progenitors with mass loss over 10^{−4} M_{☉}/year, including VY CMa, are likely to produce SLSNe, although noting that SLSNe today are likely rarer than at high redshift in the early universe.

An early study in 2009 showed that CO emission coincides with the bright KI shell in its asymmetric nebula. As such, it suggested both traced a potential pre-supernova environment, and that VY CMa may hence explode anytime soon, as suggested for Betelgeuse. In this scenario, it would produce either a moderately luminous and long-lasting type IIn supernova (SN IIn) similar to SN 1988Z or less likely a type Ib supernova, but probably not as luminous as SN 2006tf or SN 2006gy. This would demonstrate that LBVs are not the sole progenitors of SNe IIn, and it would underline the requirement that SNe IIn progenitors suffer series of substantial mass loss before exploding shortly after. An immediate paper deduced the progenitor of SN 2005ip to be an extreme red supergiant like VY CMa based on a calculated mass loss comparable to the latter. However, later studies favored a more massive progenitor with a higher mass loss rate, like a LBV. Despite that, it has also been noted that the progenitor cannot be strongly constrained, and that binary evolution may also be related to the high mass-loss rate.

The explosion could be associated with gamma-ray bursts (GRB), and it will produce a shock wave at a speed of a few thousand kilometers per second that could hit the surrounding envelope of material, causing strong emission for many years after the explosion. For a star so large, the remnant would probably be a black hole rather than a neutron star.

=== Second-stage red supergiant ===
Although mostly speculative and unconfirmed, papers from 2016 and 2024 considered VY CMa and later NML Cyg as possible candidates for stars in a second red supergiant phase due to their massive arcs, clumps, and evidence for extreme activity, plus their peculiar chemistry with carbon compounds. Similar to less massive AGB stars, it may have evolved blueward into a post-RSG warm hypergiant and then redward into a "VY CMa-like" extreme red supergiant in a very short and final high mass loss state. In this scenario, its core would eventually directly collapse to a black hole, without producing a supernova first, unlike in previous models.

N6946-BH1 was believed to be a massive red supergiant star (comparable to VY CMa in terms of properties) or a yellow hypergiant that collapsed into a black hole after several outburst episodes, forming a burst of neutrinos that lowered the stellar mass by a fraction of a percent and therefore a failed supernova via shock wave that blasted out the star's envelope. Supplying evidence contrary to the conventional idea that black holes usually form soon after a supernova, this would also explain the rate of large star formation with initial masses over 18 M_{☉} that appears to exceed the rate of type II supernovae. Although the failed supernova hypothesis currently cannot be ruled out, observations from the James Webb Space Telescope match that of a stellar merger.

With an observed correlation for increased mass loss with increasing luminosity and cooler temperatures among the red supergiants, another possibility is that evolving red supergiants may appear as even cooler (i.e surrounded by a forming pseudo-photosphere) with more extended envelopes and higher mass loss rates, similar to Eta Carinae A.

== See also ==
- Epsilon Aurigae – An eclipsing binary star containing a companion formerly considered the largest known star
- HR 5171 – A multiple star system containing an extremely large yellow hypergiant star
- R136a1 – One of the most massive and luminous stars known
