= Sh 2-310 =

Molecular cloud in the constellation Canis Major

Sharpless 2-310
Nebula
- H II region
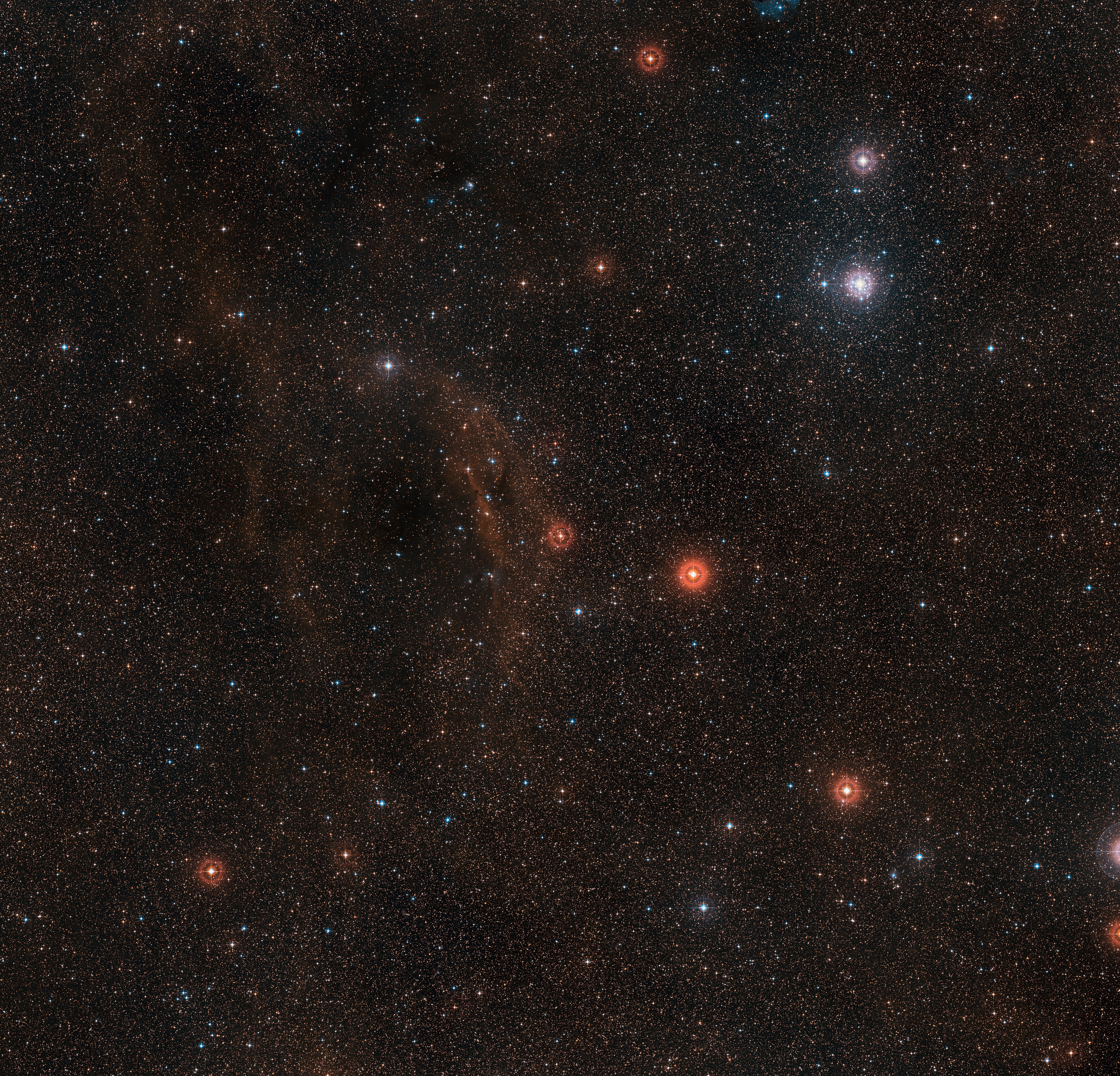
- Combined optical and infrared image of VY CMa (centre) and Sh 2-310. The bright star at the upper right is τ Canis Majoris.

Observation data: J2000 epoch
- Right ascension: 07^{h} 24^{m} 04^{s}
- Declination: −25° 58′ 15″
- Distance: 4,890 ly (1,500 pc)
- Apparent dimensions (V): 480′ × 480′
- Constellation: Canis Major
- Designations: Sharpless 310, Sh 2-310, Gum 8, RCW 15, LBN 1059

Sh 2-310 is a nebula in the slightly southern constellation of Canis Major. It is one of the largest H II regions known in the Milky Way. It is ionized by the stars UW and Tau Canis Majoris. The latter is the brightest star of the open cluster NGC 2362, which is located near the nebula, while another member, the red hypergiant VY Canis Majoris, is located near the nebula's rim.
