= NGC 6826 =

Planetary nebula in the constellation Cygnus

Emission nebula
- Planetary nebula
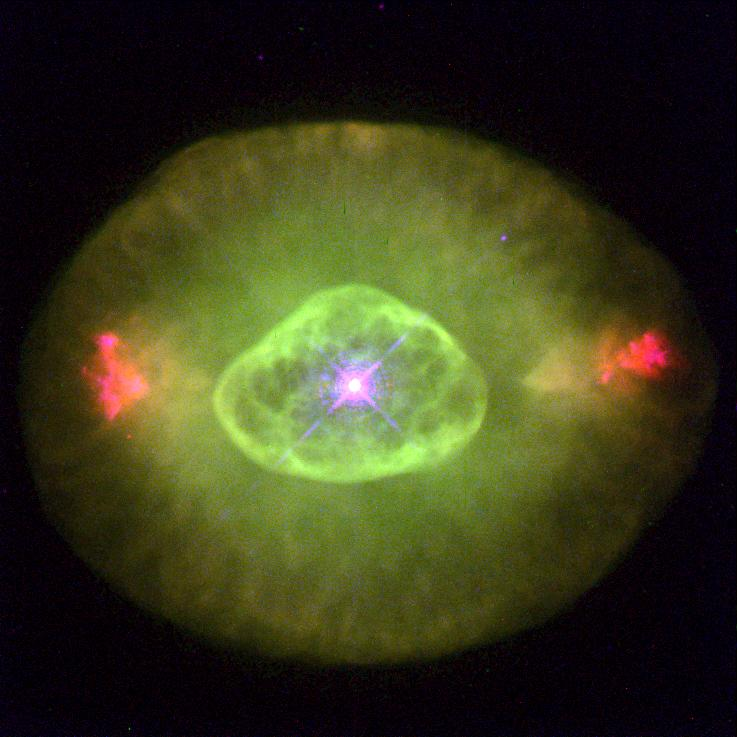
- Hubble Space Telescope (HST) image of NGC 6826; Credit: HST/NASA/ESA.

Observation data: J2000 epoch
- Right ascension: 19^{h} 44^{m} 48.2^{s}
- Declination: +50° 31′ 30.3″
- Distance: ~2000 ly
- Apparent magnitude (V): 8.8
- Apparent dimensions (V): 27″ × 24″
- Constellation: Cygnus

Physical characteristics
- Radius: 0.22 x 0.20 ly
- Designations: HD 186924, SAO 31951, Caldwell 15

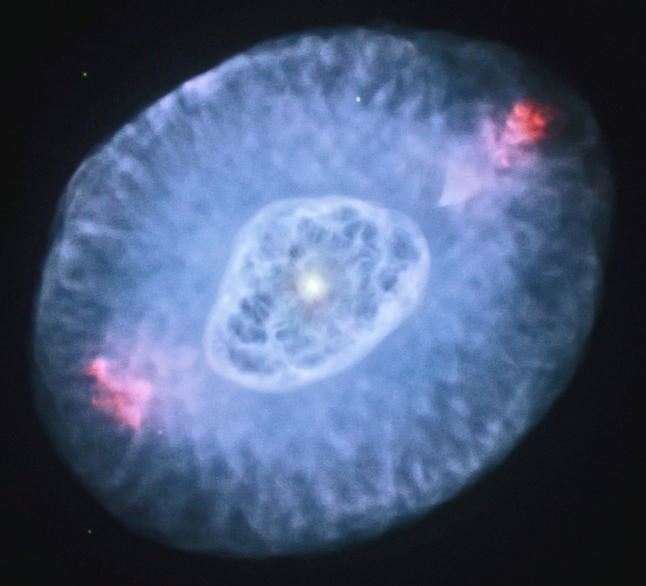

NGC 6826 (also known as Caldwell 15) is a planetary nebula located in the constellation Cygnus. It is commonly referred to as the "Blinking Planetary", although many other nebulae exhibit such "blinking". When viewed through a small telescope, the brightness of the central star overwhelms the eye when viewed directly, obscuring the surrounding nebula. However, it can be viewed well using averted vision, which causes it to "blink" in and out of view as the observer's eye wanders.

A distinctive feature of this nebula are the two bright patches on either side, which are known as Fast Low-Ionization Emission Regions, or FLIERS. They appear to be relatively young, moving outwards at supersonic speeds.

HD 186924 is the central star of the planetary nebula. It is an O-type star with a spectral type of O6fp.

== See also ==
- List of planetary nebulae
- List of NGC objects
