= HD 151804 =

Star in the constellation Scorpius

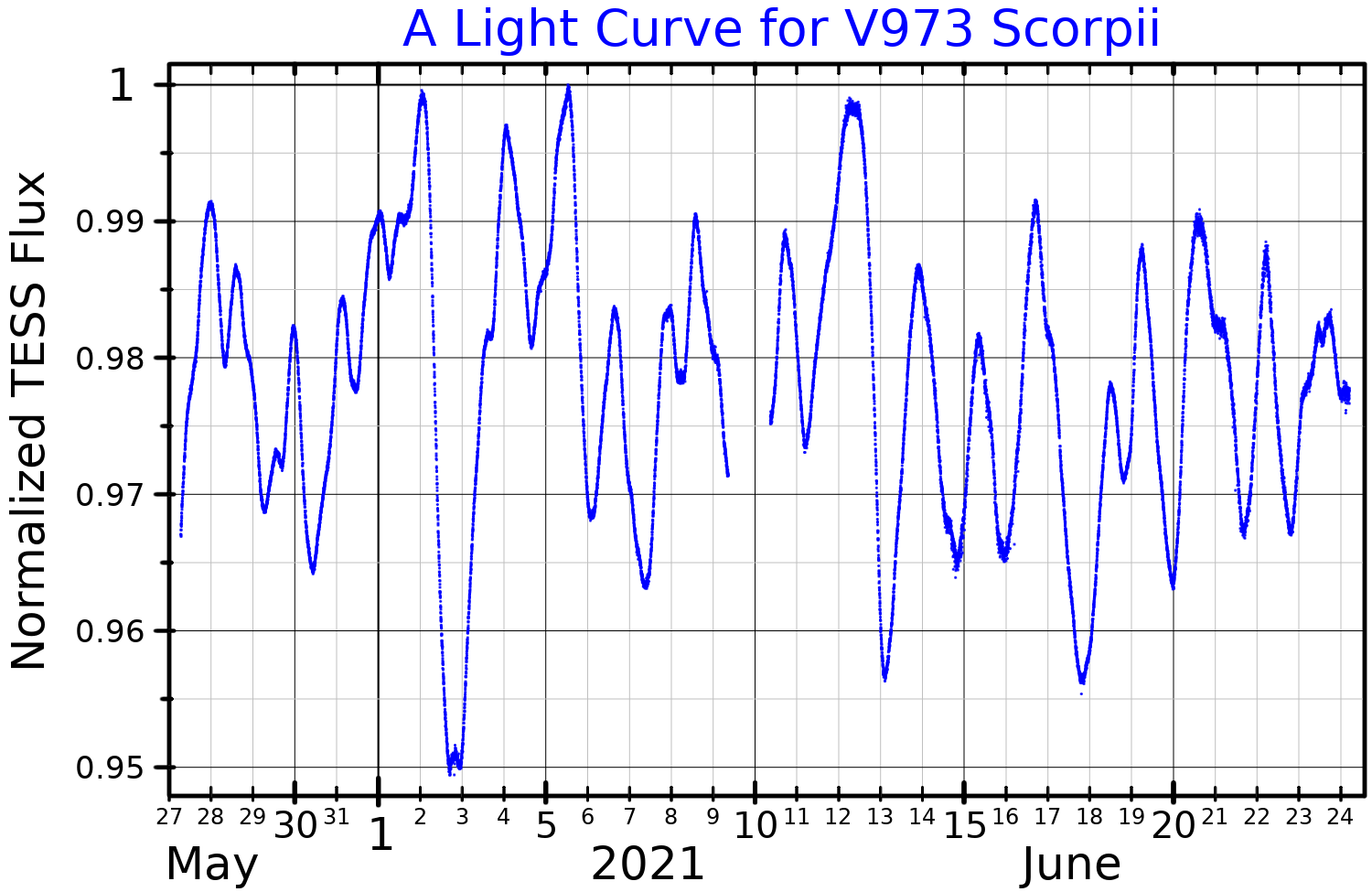
- A light curve for V973 Scorpii, plotted from TESS data

Observation data Epoch J2000.0 Equinox J2000.0
- Constellation: Scorpius
- Right ascension: 16^{h} 51^{m} 33.72181^{s}
- Declination: −41° 13′ 49.9195″
- Apparent magnitude (V): 5.22 - 5.28

Characteristics
- Spectral type: O8 Iaf
- U−B color index: −0.838±0.039
- B−V color index: 0.066±0.013
- Variable type: α Cygni

Astrometry
Radial velocity (R_{v})	−63±4 km/s
Proper motion (μ)	RA: −0.693±0.125 mas/yr Dec.: −0.754±0.105 mas/yr
Parallax (π)	0.4893±0.1180 mas
Distance	approx. 7,000 ly (approx. 2,000 pc)
Absolute magnitude (M_{V})	−7.3

Details
Mass	40±5 M_{☉}
Radius	35.4±1.2 R_{☉}
Luminosity	800000+500000 −300000 L_{☉}
Surface gravity (log g)	3.0±0.2 cgs
Temperature	29000±500 K
Rotational velocity (v sin i)	104±14 km/s
Age	2.1 Myr

Other designations
- V973 Sco, HR 6245, HIP 82493, SAO 227313

Database references
SIMBAD	data

HD 151804, also known as HR 6245 and V973 Scorpii, is a blue supergiant star about 7000 light years from the Earth, in the constellation Scorpius. It is a 5th magnitude star, so it will be faintly visible to the naked eye of an observer far from city lights. It is a variable star, whose brightness varies slightly from magnitude 5.22 to 5.28, on time scales of a few days. It is one of the brightest stars in the Scorpius OB1 association, and is located half a degree from NGC 6231, which is part of the same association.

HD 151804 was determined to be a Wolf-Rayet star sometime between 1888 and 1894 at the Harvard College Observatory. More modern publications classify it as an Of star, however.

Photometric observations published by Bart Bok et al. in 1966 and Nancy Morrison in 1975 indicated than HD 151804 might be a variable star. Variability was confirmed by Arnout van Genderen et al. in 1989. They could not deduce a period, but noted that it varied on a timescale of less than two days. In 1990, HD 151804 was given the variable star designation V973 Scorpii.

Tahina Ramiaramanantsoa et al. studied HD 151804 in 2015, using the BRITE constellation of nanosatellites. During their two-month period of high cadence observations, they found that the star's brightness varied by 0.04 magnitudes, showing a superposition of a large number of periods, the most pronounced of which were less than one day. These different pulsation modes had lifetimes of five to ten days. They argue that these pulsations may be gravity waves, stochastically excited by the star's convective core.

In 1968, John Hutchings discovered that HD 151804 has a stellar wind. It is losing mass at a rate of 6×10^{−6}M_{☉} per year. The wind's terminal velocity is 1450 km/sec.
