= Fast Low-Ionization Emission Region =

A Fast Low-Ionization Emission Region, or FLIER, is a volume of gas with low ionization, moving at supersonic speeds, near the symmetry axis of many planetary nebulae. Their outflow speeds are significantly higher than the nebulae in which they are embedded, and their ionizations are much lower. FLIERs' high speeds suggest ages much younger than their parent nebulae, and their low ionizations indicate that the ultraviolet radiation that ionizes the gas around them does not penetrate into the FLIERs. The Blinking Planetary features a set of FLIERs.
