= UW Canis Majoris =

Beta Lyrae variable star in the constellation Canis Major

- Location of UW CMa (circled)

Observation data Epoch J2000.0 Equinox ICRS
- Constellation: Canis Major
- Right ascension: 07^{h} 18^{m} 40.37894^{s}
- Declination: −24° 33′ 31.3182″
- Apparent magnitude (V): 4.95 (4.82 - 5.33)

Characteristics
- Spectral type: O7.5-8Iabf + O9.7Ib
- U−B color index: −1.00
- B−V color index: −0.15
- Variable type: Beta Lyrae

Astrometry
Radial velocity (R_{v})	20 km/s
Proper motion (μ)	RA: −2.865 mas/yr Dec.: +3.678 mas/yr
Parallax (π)	0.8549±0.1277 mas
Distance	approx. 3,800 ly (approx. 1,200 pc)
Absolute magnitude (M_{V})	−6.1

Orbit
Period (P)	4.39 days
Semi-major axis (a)	34-48 R_{☉}
Eccentricity (e)	0
Inclination (i)	71.0-71.6°
Longitude of the node (Ω)	3.3-4.5°

Details

UW CMa A
Mass	11-44 M_{☉}
Radius	12-20 R_{☉}
Luminosity	170,000-450,000 L_{☉}
Temperature	33,750 K

UW CMa B
Mass	17-33 M_{☉}
Radius	14-17 R_{☉}
Luminosity	240,000-330,000 L_{☉}
Temperature	33,300-33,700 K

Other designations
- UW Canis Majoris, 29 Canis Majoris, HR 2781, HD 57060, CD−24°5173, HIP 35412, SAO 173444, GC 9734

Database references
SIMBAD	data

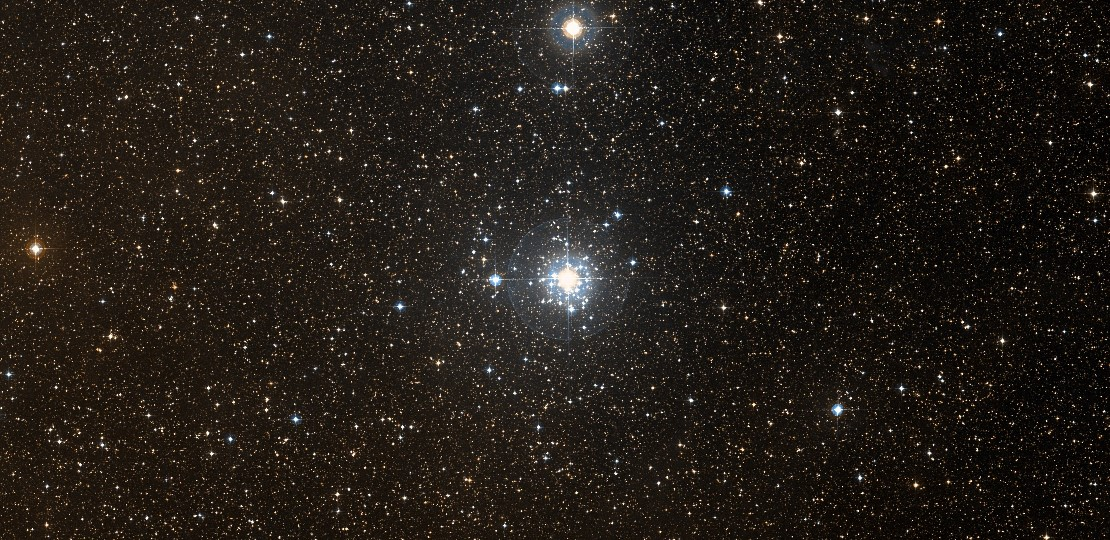
NGC 2362 with UW CMa at the top (north) of the frame

UW Canis Majoris is a star in the constellation Canis Major. It is classified as a Beta Lyrae eclipsing contact binary and given the variable star designation UW Canis Majoris. Its brightness varies from magnitude +4.84 to +5.33 with a period of 4.39 days. Bode had initially labelled it as Tau^{2} Canis Majoris, but this designation had been dropped by Gould and subsequent authors. It is visible to the naked eye of a person under good observing conditions.

Sergai Gaposchnhkin analyzed 376 photographic plates taken over a twelve year period, and announced in 1936 that 29 Canis Majoris is a variable star. It was given its variable star designation in 1936.

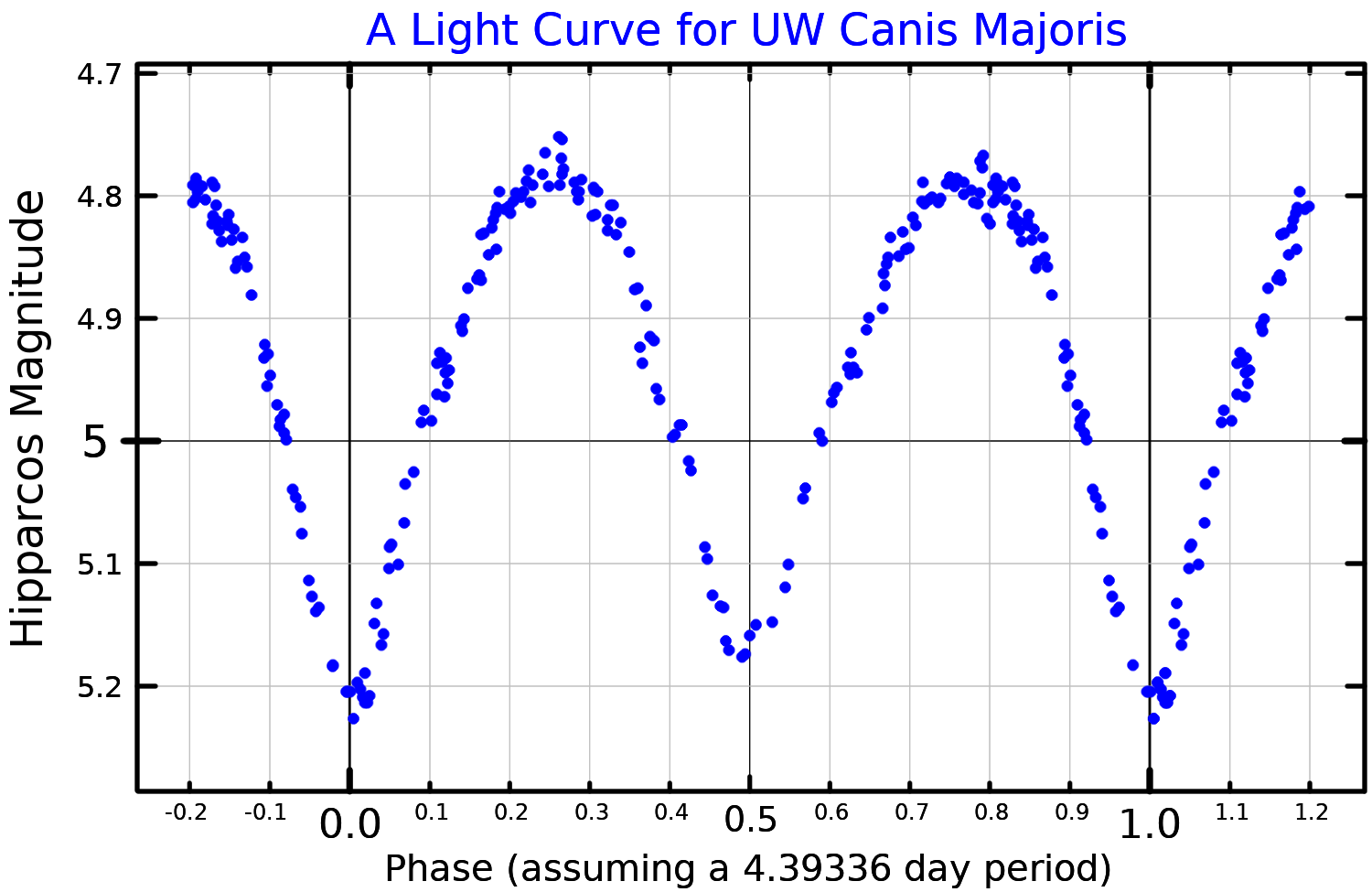
A light curve for UW Canis Majoris from Hipparcos data, adapted from Antokhina et al. (2011)

UW Canis Majoris A is a rare blue supergiant of spectral type O7.5-8 Iab. The precise characteristics of the system are still uncertain, in part because the spectral signature of the secondary is very hard to disentangle from the spectrum of the primary and the surrounding envelope of stellar wind. A detailed spectral study by Gies et al. found that the primary had a diameter 13 times that of the Sun, while its secondary companion is a slightly cooler, less evolved and less luminous supergiant of spectral type O9.7Ib that is 10 times the Sun's diameter. According to this study, the brighter star is the more luminous, its luminosity 200,000 times that of the Sun as opposed to the secondary's 63,000 times. However the secondary is the more massive star at 19 Solar masses (M_{☉}) compared to the primary's 16 M_{☉}.

However, a more recent photometric analysis finds several configurations of mass and luminosity ratios that match the observed data.

Parallax measurements showed it to be approximately 3,000 light years from Earth, but this is unexpectedly close for a star of its spectral type and brightness. More accurate Hipparcos parallax data gives an even closer result around 2000 light years, but Gaia Data Release 3 gives a parallax of 0.85±0.13 mas, corresponding to a distance of around 3,800 light years. It is thought to be a distant member of NGC 2362 which would place it about 5,000 light years and more closely match its expected luminosity. The contradiction between the different distance results is still a subject of research.

UW Canis Majoris is part of the giant HII Region Sh2-310 and it along with Tau Canis Majoris which is the brightest member of NGC 2362, HD 58011, and VY Canis Majoris are thought to be are thought to be probable sources of ionization of gases in Sh2-310.
