= O-type star =

Stellar classification

Relative size of O-type stars with other main-sequence stars

An O-type star is a hot, blue star of spectral type O in the Yerkes classification system employed by astronomers. They have surface temperatures in excess of 30,000 kelvins (K). Stars of this type have strong absorption lines of ionised helium, strong lines of other ionised elements, and hydrogen and neutral helium lines weaker than spectral type B.

Stars of this type are very rare, but because they are very bright, they can be seen at great distances; out of the 90 brightest stars as seen from Earth, 4 are type O. (Note: The 4 visibly bright O-type stars are Gamma Velorum, Alnitak (Zeta Orionis), Mintaka (Delta Orionis), and Zeta Puppis.) Due to their high mass, O-type stars end their lives rather quickly in violent supernova explosions, resulting in black holes or neutron stars. Most of these stars are young massive main sequence, giant, or supergiant stars, but also some central stars of planetary nebulae, old low-mass stars near the end of their lives, which typically have O-like spectra.

O-type stars are typically found in regions of active star formation, such as the spiral arms of a spiral galaxy or a pair of galaxies undergoing collision and merger (such as the Antennae Galaxies). This is partially by greater availability of star-forming material (primarily In those regions) partially by default, as they have extremely short life spans, and will burn out before they ever leave. These stars illuminate any surrounding material and are largely responsible for the distinct bluish-white and pink coloration of a galaxy's arms. Furthermore, O-type stars often occur in multiple star systems, where their evolution is more difficult to predict due to mass transfer and the possibility of component stars exploding as supernovae at different times.

== Classification ==
O-type stars are classified by the relative strength of certain spectral lines. The key lines are the prominent He^{+} lines at 454.1 nm and 420.0 nm, which vary from very weak at O9.5 to very strong in O2–O7, and the He^{0} lines at 447.1 nm and 402.6 nm, which vary from absent in O2/3 to prominent in O9.5. The O7 class is defined where the 454.1 nanometer He^{+} and 447.1 nanometer He^{0} lines have equal strength. The very hottest O-type stars have such weak neutral He lines that they must be separated on the relative strength of the N^{2+} and N^{3+} lines.

The luminosity classes of O-type stars are assigned on the relative strengths of the He^{+} emission lines and certain ionised nitrogen and silicon lines. These are indicated by the "f" suffix on the spectral type, with "f" alone indicating N^{2+} and He^{+} emission, "(f)" meaning the He emission is weak or absent, "((f))" meaning the N emission is weak or absent, "f*" indicates the addition of very strong N^{3+} emission, and "f+" the presence of Si^{3+} emission. Luminosity class V, main-sequence stars, generally have weak or missing emission lines, with giants and supergiants showing increasing emission line strength. At O2–O4, the distinction between main sequence and supergiant stars is narrow, and may not even represent true luminosity or evolutionary differences. At intermediate O5–O8 classes, the distinction between "O((f))" main sequence, "O(f)" giants, and "Of" supergiants is well-defined and represents a definite increase in luminosity. The increasing strength of Si^{3+} emission is also an indicator of increasing luminosity and this is the primary means of assigning luminosity classes to the late O type stars.

Star types O3 to O8 are classified as luminosity class sub-type "Vz" if they have a particularly strong 468.6 nm ionised helium line. The line's presence is thought to indicate extreme youth; the "z" stands for zero-age.

To help with the classification of O-type stars, standard examples are listed for most of the defined types. The following table gives one of the standard stars for each spectral type. In some cases, a standard star has not been defined. For spectral types O2 to O5.5, supergiants are not split into Ia / Iab / Ib sub-types: Subgiant spectral types are not defined for types O2, O2.5, or O3. Bright giant luminosity classes are not defined for stars hotter than O6.

Class O spectral standard stars
	Vz	V	IV	III	II	I	Ib	Iab	Ia
O2		BI 253		HD 269810		HD 93129 Aa / Ab			
O3	HD 64568	tbd		tbd		Cyg OB2-7			
O3.5	HD 93128	HD 93129 B		Pismis 24-17		Sher 18			
O4	HD 96715	HD 46223	HD 93250	ST 2-22		HD 15570			
O4.5	tbd	HD 15629	HD 193682	tbd		Cyg OB2-9			
O5	HD 46150	HDE 319699	HD 168112	HD 93843		CPD -47 2963 AB			
O5.5	tbd	HD 93204	tbd	tbd		Cyg OB2-11			
O6	HD 42088	ALS 4880	HD 101190 Aa / Ab	HDE 338931	HDE 229196		tbd	tbd	HD 169582
O6.5	HD 91572	HD 12993	HDE 322417	HD 152733 Aa / Ab	HD 157857		tbd	tbd	HD 163758
O7	HD 97966	HD 93146	ALS 12320	Cyg OB2-4 A	HD 94963		HD 69464	tbd	tbd
O7.5	HD 152590	HD 35619	HD 97319	HD 163800	HD 34656		HD 17603	9 Sge	tbd
O8	HDE 305539	HD 101223	HD 94024	λ Ori A	63 Oph		BD-11°4586	HD 225160	HD 151804
O8.5		HD 14633 Aa / Ab	HD 46966 Aa / Ab	HD 114737 A / B	HD 75211		HD 125241	tbd	HDE 303492
O9		10 Lac	HD 93028	HD 93249 A	τ CMa Aa / Ab		19 Cep	HD 202124	α Cam
O9.2		HD 46202	HD 96622	HD 16832	ALS 11761		HD 76968	HD 218915	HD 152424
O9.5		AE Aur, μ Col	HD 192001	HD 96264	δ Ori Aa / Ab		tbd	HD 188209	tbd
O9.7		υ Ori	HD 207538	HD 189957	HD 68450		HD 47432	μ Nor	GS Mus

== Characteristics ==
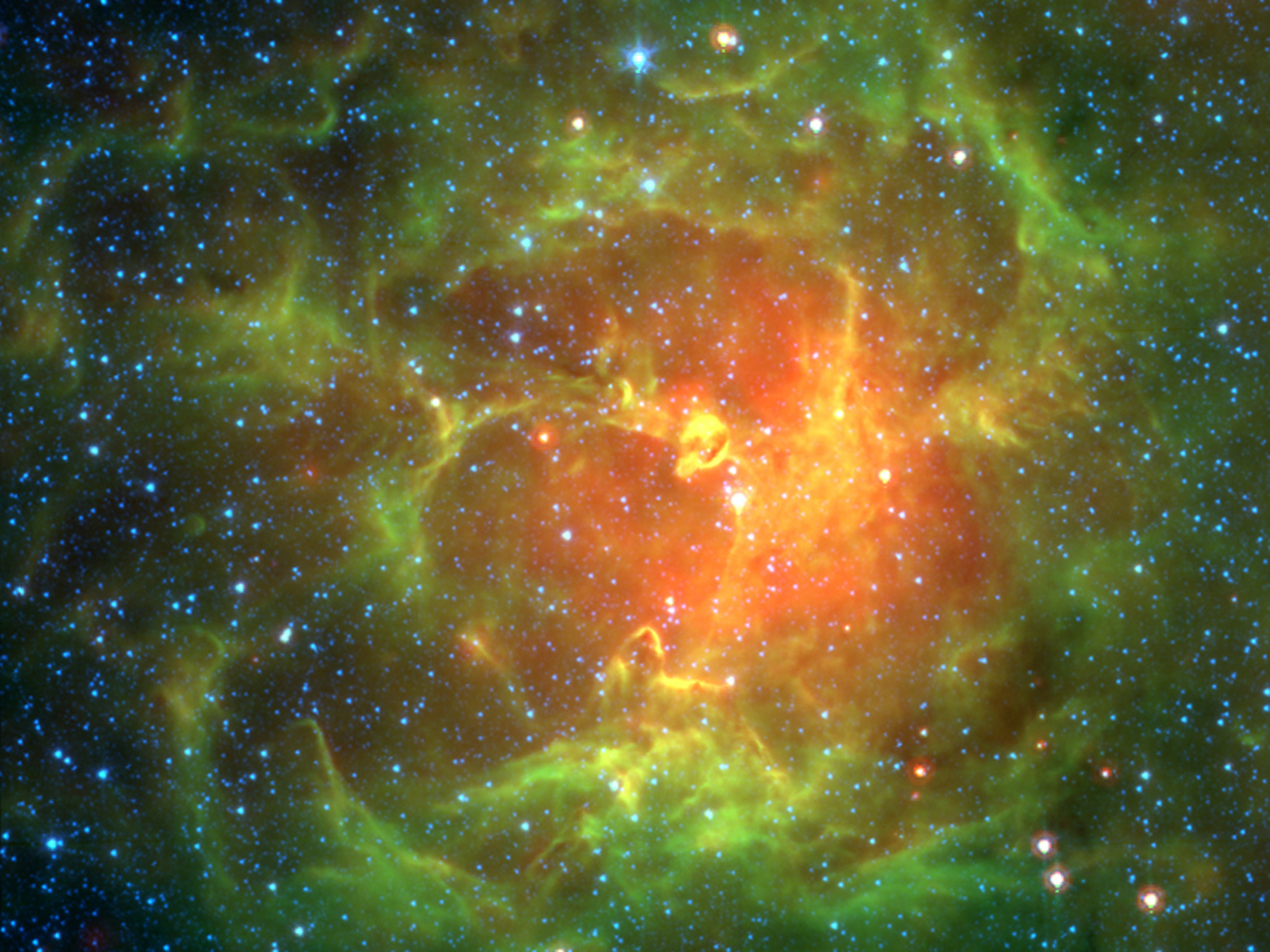
The Trifid Nebula (M20) is sculpted and lit by the luminous O7.5III star visible at its centre in this infrared image.

O-type stars are hot and luminous. They have characteristic surface temperatures ranging from 30,000 to 52,000 K, emit intense ultraviolet ('actinic') light, and so appear in the visible spectrum as bluish-white. Because of their high temperatures the luminosities of main sequence O-type stars range from 10,000 times the Sun to around 1,000,000 times, giants from 100,000 times the Sun to over 1,000,000, and supergiants from about 200,000 times the Sun to several million times, although their masses are no more than about 200M_{☉}.

Other stars in the same temperature range include rare subdwarf O-type (sdO) stars, the central stars of planetary nebulae (CSPNe), and white dwarfs. The white dwarfs have their own spectral classification scheme, but many CSPNe have O-type spectra. Even these small low-mass subdwarfs and CSPNe have luminosities several hundred to several thousand times that of the Sun. Type sdO stars generally have somewhat higher temperatures than massive O-type stars, up to 100,000 K.

O-type stars represent the highest masses of stars on the main sequence. The coolest of them have initial masses of around 16 times the Sun. It is unclear what the upper limit to the mass of an O-type star would be. At solar metallicity levels, stars should not be able to form with masses above 120–150M_{☉}, but at lower metallicity this limit is much higher. O-type stars form only a tiny fraction of main-sequence stars and the vast majority of these are towards the lower end of the mass range. The most massive and hottest types O3 and O2 are extremely rare, were only defined in 1971 and 2002 respectively, and only a handful are known in total. Giant and supergiant stars are somewhat less massive than the most massive main sequence O-type stars due to mass loss, but are still among the most massive stars known.

The formation rate of class O stars cannot be observed directly, but initial mass functions (IMF) can be derived that model observations of existing star populations and particularly young star clusters. Depending on the chosen IMF, class O stars form at a rate of one in several hundred main sequence stars. Because the luminosity of these stars increases out of proportion to their masses, they have correspondingly shorter lifespans. The most massive spend less than a million years on the main sequence and explode as supernovae after three or four million years. The least luminous O-type stars can remain on the main sequence for around 10 million years, but cool slowly during that time and become early B-type stars. No massive star remains with spectral class O for more than about 5–6 million years. Although sdO and CSPNe stars are low-mass stars billions of years old, the time spent in this phase of their lives is extremely short, of the order of 10,000,000 years. The present day mass function can be directly observed, and in the solar neighbourhood less than one in 2,000,000 stars is class O. Differing estimates find between 0.00003% (0.00002% if white dwarfs are included) and 0.00005% of stars being of class O.

It has been estimated that there are around 20,000 massive O-type stars in the Milky Way. The low-mass sdO and CSPNe O-type stars are probably more common, although less luminous and therefore harder to find. Despite their short lifetimes, they are thought to be normal stages in the evolution of common stars only a little more massive than the Sun.

No exoplanets around O-type stars have been detected so far, although a brown dwarf has been detected around an O-type star named CEN 16.

=== Structure ===
CNO cycle that powers massive O-type stars.

Structure of low-mass, intermediate-mass, and high-mass stars. Mass (indicated by "M") is in units of solar masses.

O-type main-sequence stars are fueled by nuclear fusion, as are all main-sequence stars. However, the high mass of O-type stars results in extremely high core temperatures. At these temperatures, hydrogen fusion with the CNO cycle dominates the production of the star's energy and consumes its nuclear fuel at a much higher rate than low-mass stars which fuse hydrogen predominantly through the proton–proton cycle. The intense energy generated by O-type stars cannot be radiated out of their cores efficiently enough, and consequently their cores have vigorous convective flow. The radiative zones of O-type stars occur between the core and photosphere. This mixing of core material into the upper layers is often enhanced by fast rotation, and has a dramatic effect on the evolution of O-type stars. They start to slowly expand and show giant or supergiant characteristics while still burning hydrogen in their cores, then may remain as blue supergiants for much of the time during helium core burning.

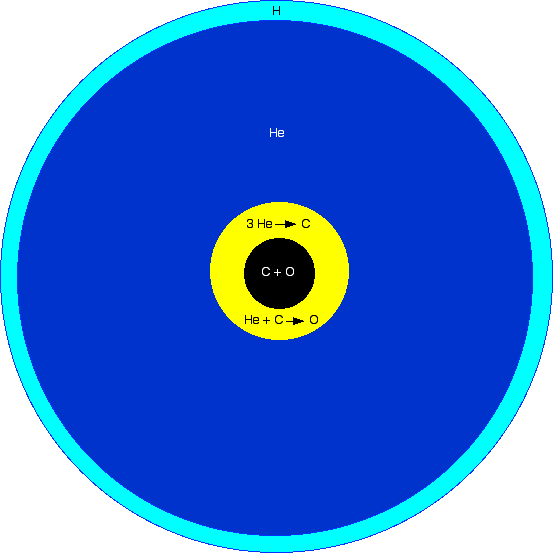
sdO-type star cross-section showing inert core and helium shell burning

Type "sdO" stars and CSPNe-type have a substantially different structure. Although they have a wide range of distinct characteristics, it is not fully understood how they all form and develop; they are thought to have degenerate cores that will eventually be exposed as a white dwarf. Before then the material outside that core is mostly helium with a thin layer of hydrogen, which is rapidly being lost due to the strong stellar wind. There may be several different origins for this type of star, but at least some of them have an internal shell-like layer where helium is being fused. That shell-burning enlarges the core and provides the power for these small stars' high luminosities.

=== Evolution ===
Evolutionary tracks on the HR diagram. The 15M_{☉} and 60M_{☉} tracks are typical of massive O-type stars.

In the lifecycle of O-type stars, different metallicities and rotation rates introduce considerable variation in their evolution, but the basics remain the same.

O-type stars start to move slowly from the zero-age main sequence almost immediately after they form, gradually becoming cooler and slightly more luminous. Although they may be characterised spectroscopically as giants or supergiants, they continue to burn hydrogen in their cores for several million years and develop in a very different manner from low-mass stars such as the Sun. Most O-type main-sequence stars will evolve more or less horizontally in the HR diagram towards cooler temperatures, from an 'actinic' violet to blue, becoming blue supergiants. Core helium ignition occurs smoothly (no flash) as the stars expand and cool. There are a number of complex phases depending on the exact mass of the star and other initial conditions, but the lowest mass O-type stars will eventually evolve into red supergiants while still burning helium in their cores. If they do not explode as a supernova first, they will then lose their outer layers and become hotter again, sometimes going through a number of blue loops before finally reaching the Wolf–Rayet stage.

The more-massive stars, initially main-sequence stars hotter than about O9, never become red supergiants because strong convection and high luminosity blow away the outer layers too quickly. 25–60M_{☉} stars may become yellow hypergiants before either exploding as a supernova or evolving back to hotter temperatures. Above about 60M_{☉}, O-type stars evolve through a short blue hypergiant or luminous blue variable phase directly to Wolf–Rayet stars. The most massive O-type stars develop a WNLh spectral type as they start to convect material from the core towards the surface, and these are the most luminous stars that exist.

Low to intermediate-mass stars age in a very different way, through red giant, horizontal branch, asymptotic giant branch (AGB), and then post-AGB phases. Post-AGB evolution generally involves dramatic mass loss, sometimes leaving a planetary nebula, and leaving an increasingly hot exposed stellar interior. If there is sufficient helium and hydrogen remaining, these small but extremely hot stars have an O-type spectrum. They increase in temperature until shell burning and mass loss ceases, then they cool into white dwarfs.

At certain masses or chemical makeups, or perhaps as a result of binary interactions, some of these lower-mass stars become unusually hot during the horizontal branch or AGB phases. There may be multiple reasons, not fully understood, including stellar mergers or very late thermal pulses re-igniting post-AGB stars. These appear as very hot OB stars, but only moderately luminous and below the main sequence. There are both O (sdO) and B (sdB) hot subdwarfs, although they may develop in entirely different ways. The sdO-type stars have fairly normal O spectra but luminosities only around a thousand times the Sun.

== Examples ==
O-type stars are rare but luminous, so they are easy to detect and there are a number of naked eye examples.

Central stars of planetary nebulae
Main article: Planetary nebula

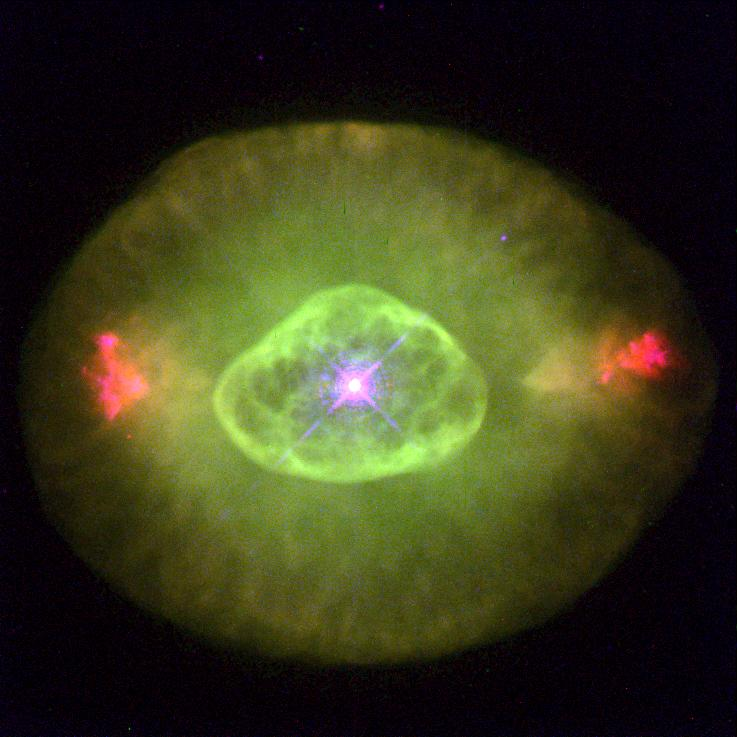
The central star of NGC 6826 is a low-mass O6 star.

NGC 2392 (O6)
IC 418 (O7fp)
NGC 6826 (O6fp)

Subdwarfs
Main article: Subdwarf O star

HD 49798 (sdO6p)
V846 Arae B (sdO)
Kappa^{1} Apodis B (sdO)

Supergiants
Main article: Blue supergiant

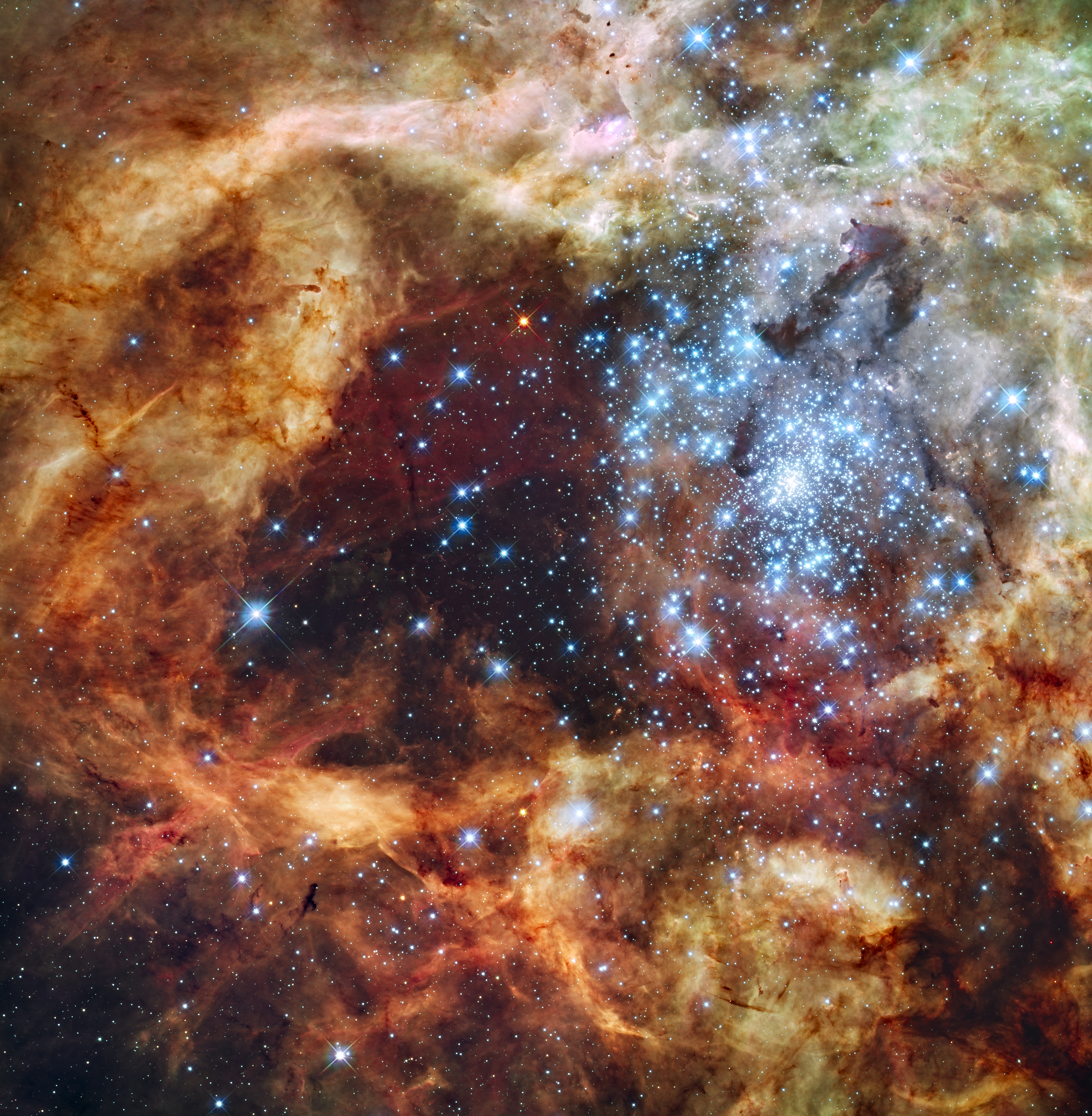
Melnick 42, one of the hottest O supergiants, lies in the Tarantula Nebula.

29 Canis Majoris
Alnitak
Alpha Camelopardalis
Cygnus X-1
Zeta Puppis

Giants

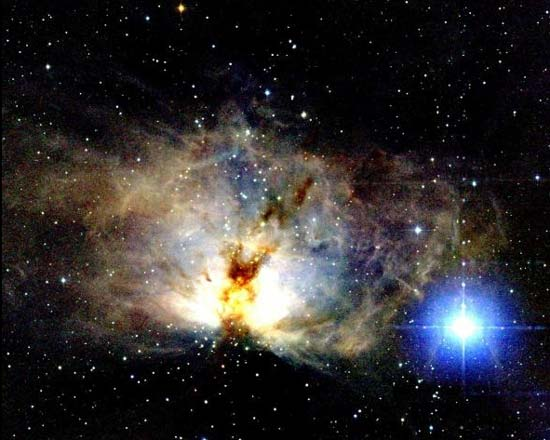
Alnitak is a triple star system with an O9.7 supergiant and an O9 giant as well as a B0 giant. These stars illuminate the nearby Flame Nebula.

Main article: Blue giant

Iota Orionis
LH 54-425
Meissa
Tau Canis Majoris
Plaskett's star
Xi Persei
Mintaka
HD 164492 A

Main-sequence

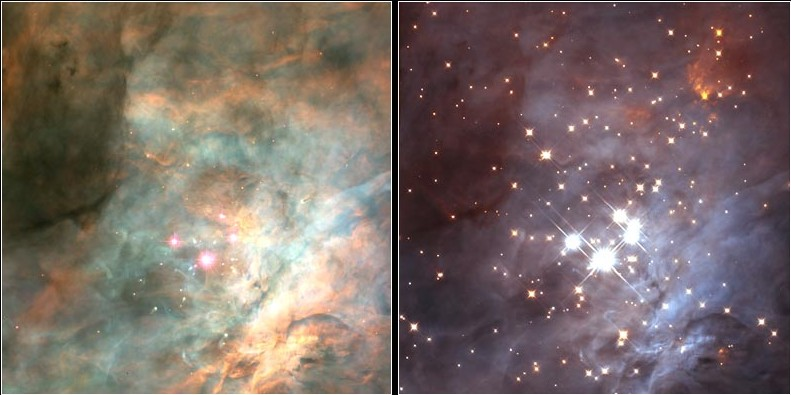
The brightest star in the Trapezium Cluster is O7V star θ^{1} Orionis C. The other three are B0.5 and B1 main-sequence stars.

Main article: O-type main-sequence star

9 Sagittarii
10 Lacertae
AE Aurigae
BI 253
Delta Circini
HD 93205 (V560 Carinae)
Mu Columbae
Sigma Orionis
Theta1 Orionis C
VFTS 102
Zeta Ophiuchi

== Location ==
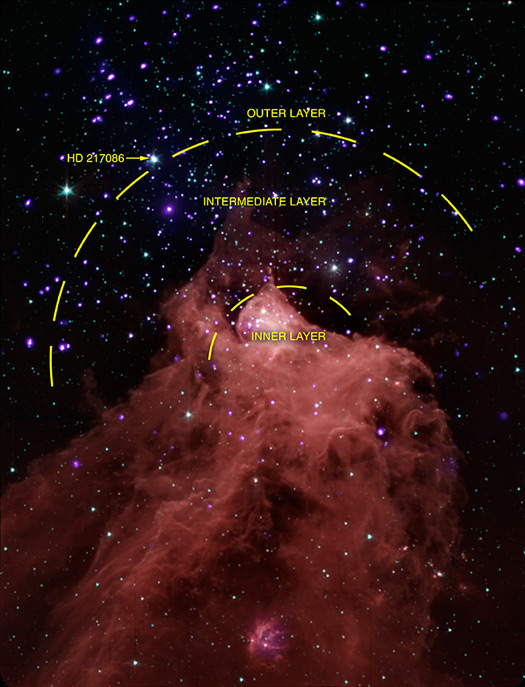
The O-type star in Cepheus B, HD 217086, illuminates the molecular cloud with ultraviolet radiation, driving it back while compressing it, triggering the formation of new stars.

=== Spiral arms ===
O-type main-sequence stars tend to appear in the arms of spiral galaxies. This is because, as a spiral arm moves through space, it compresses any molecular clouds in its way. The initial compression of these molecular clouds leads to the formation of stars, some of which are O- and B-type stars. Also, as these stars have shorter lifetimes, they cannot move great distances before their death and so they stay in or relatively near to the spiral arm in which they formed. On the other hand, less massive stars live longer and thus are found throughout the galactic disc, including in between the spiral arms.

=== O/OB associations ===
Stellar associations are groups of stars that are gravitationally unbound from the beginning of their formation. The stars in stellar associations are moving from one another so rapidly that gravitational forces cannot keep them together. In young stellar associations, most of the light comes from O- and B-type stars, so such associations are called OB associations.

=== Molecular clouds ===
The birth of an O-type star in a molecular cloud has a destructive effect on the cloud, but also may trigger the formation of new stars. O-type stars emit copious amounts of ultraviolet radiation, which ionizes the gas in the cloud and pushes it away. O-type stars also have powerful stellar winds, with velocities of thousands of kilometers per second, which can blow a bubble in the molecular cloud around the star. O-type stars explode as supernovae when they die, releasing vast amounts of energy, contributing to the disruption of a molecular cloud. These effects disperse the remaining molecular material in a star-forming region, ultimately stopping the birth of new stars, and possibly leaving behind a young open cluster.

Nevertheless, before the cloud is disrupted, the sweeping up of material by an expanding bubble (called collect and collapse) or the compression of existing cloudlets (called radiation driven implosion) may lead to the birth of new stars. Evidence of triggered star-formation has been observed in a number of star-forming regions, such as Cepheus B and the Elephant's Trunk Nebula (where it may account for 14–25% of stars formed).
