= NGC 2362 =

Open cluster in the constellation Canis Major

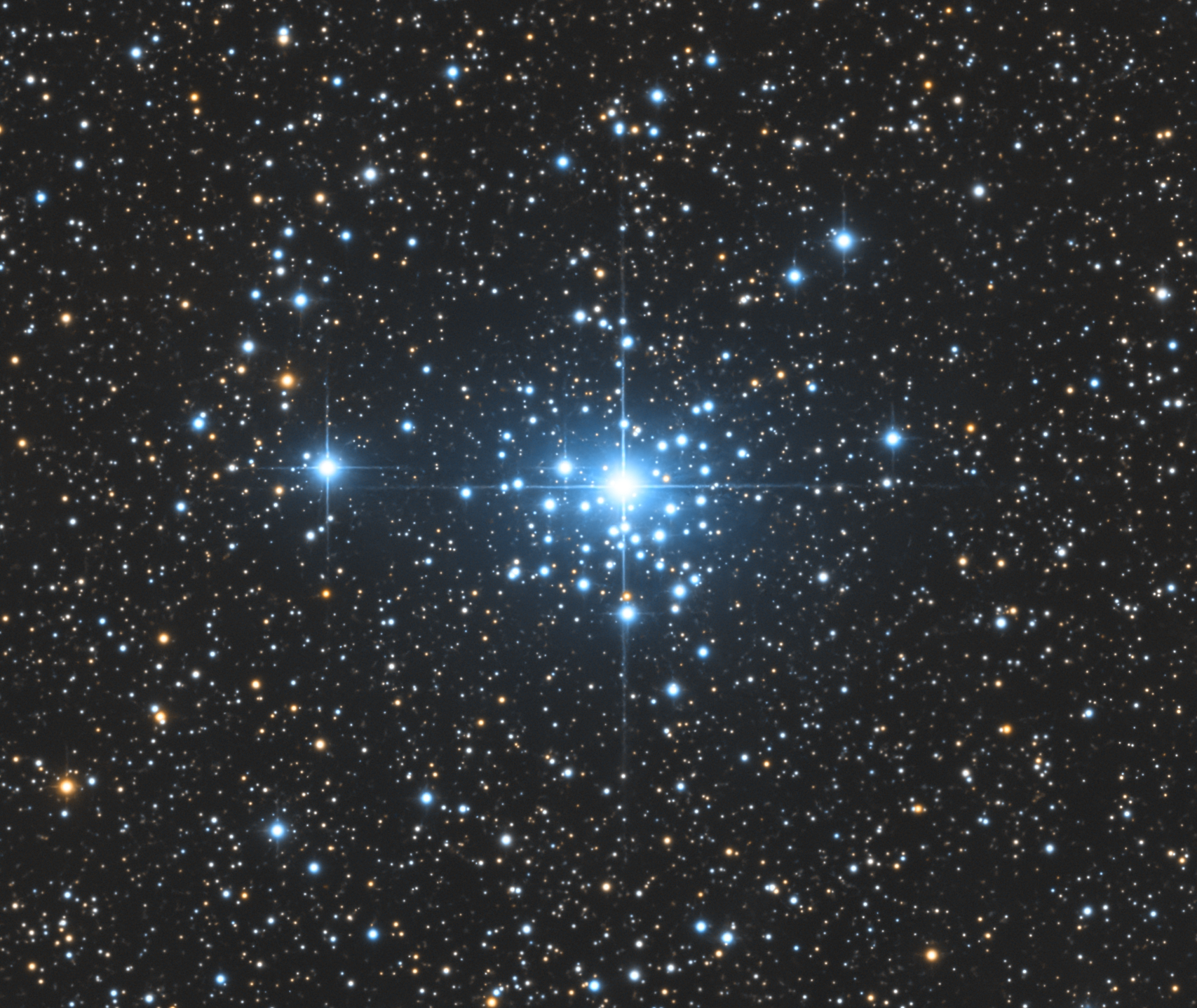
- NGC 2362 in Canis Major

Observation data (J2000 epoch)
- Right ascension: 07^{h} 18^{m} 41.0^{s}
- Declination: −24° 57′ 18″
- Distance: 4.83 ± 0.97 kly (1.480 ± 0.296 kpc)
- Apparent magnitude (V): 3.8
- Apparent dimensions (V): 6′

Physical characteristics
- Mass: ≥500 M_{☉}
- Radius: ~3 pc
- Estimated age: 5.0 Myr
- Other designations: Caldwell 64, Cr 136

Associations
- Constellation: Canis Major

Map showing the location of NGC 2362 in the constellation of Canis Major

NGC 2362, also known as Caldwell 64, is an open cluster of stars in the southern constellation of Canis Major. It was discovered by the Italian court astronomer Giovanni Batista Hodierna, who published his finding in 1654. William Herschel called it a "beautiful cluster", while William Henry Smyth said it "has a beautiful appearance, the bright white star being surrounded by a rich gathering of minute companions, in a slightly elongated form, and nearly vertical position". In the past it has also been listed as a nebula, but in 1930 Robert J. Trumpler found no evidence of nebulosity. The brightest member star system is Tau Canis Majoris, and therefore it is sometimes called the Tau Canis Majoris Cluster.

The cluster is located at a distance of approximately 1.48 kpc from the Sun, and appears associated with the giant nebula Sh2-310 that lies at the same distance, about one degree to the east. This giant H II region is being ionized by the brighter members of the NGC 2362 cluster.

At 4–5 million years, NGC 2362 is a relatively young cluster but is devoid of star-forming gas and dust, indicating that the star formation process has come to a halt. It is a massive open cluster, with more than 500 solar masses, an estimated 100-150 member stars, and an additional 500 forming a halo around the cluster. Of these cluster members, only around 35 show evidence of a debris disk. There is one slightly evolved O-type star, Tau Canis Majoris, and around 40 B-type stars still on the main sequence. Only one candidate classical Be star has been found, as of 2005.

List of NGC 2362 members brighter than magnitude 10.0
Designation	Right ascension	Declination	Spectral type	Apparent magnitude
τ CMa	07^{h} 18^{m} 42.48^{s}	−24° 57′ 15.7″	O9II	4.40
HD 57192	07^{h} 19^{m} 12.77^{s}	−24° 57′ 20.6″	B2V	6.81
CD−24°5180	07^{h} 18^{m} 48.54^{s}	−24° 56′ 56.0″		8.21
TYC 6541-4237-1	07^{h} 18^{m} 46.91^{s}	−24° 39′ 18.3″		8.38
CD−24°5175	07^{h} 18^{m} 41.07^{s}	−25° 00′ 11.4″	B2V	8.77
V422 CMa	07^{h} 18^{m} 21.94^{s}	−24° 51′ 11.9″	B2IV/V	8.94
CD−24°5162	07^{h} 18^{m} 15.41^{s}	−24° 55′ 41.3″		9.28
CD−24°5182	07^{h} 18^{m} 49.83^{s}	−24° 57′ 48.7″	B2V	9.31
NGC 2362 67	07^{h} 18^{m} 15.00^{s}	−24° 56′ 00.0″		9.32
CD−24°2205	07^{h} 18^{m} 37.49^{s}	−24° 57′ 42.1″	B3V	9.54
CD−24°5189	07^{h} 19^{m} 15.08^{s}	−25° 05′ 48.8″		9.56
CD−24°2207	07^{h} 18^{m} 38.41^{s}	−24° 58′ 20.0″	B2V	9.6
NGC 2362 39	07^{h} 18^{m} 41.99^{s}	−24° 58′ 12.2″	B2	9.78
CD−24°2250	07^{h} 19^{m} 16.75^{s}	−24° 53′ 31.4″		9.80
CD−24°5170	07^{h} 18^{m} 35.95^{s}	−24° 59′ 35.0″	B5V	9.80
CD−24°5234	07^{h} 20^{m} 46.27^{s}	−24° 34′ 19.3″		9.96
CD−25°4366	07^{h} 19^{m} 37.73^{s}	−245° 29′ 36.6″		9.98

== Gallery ==
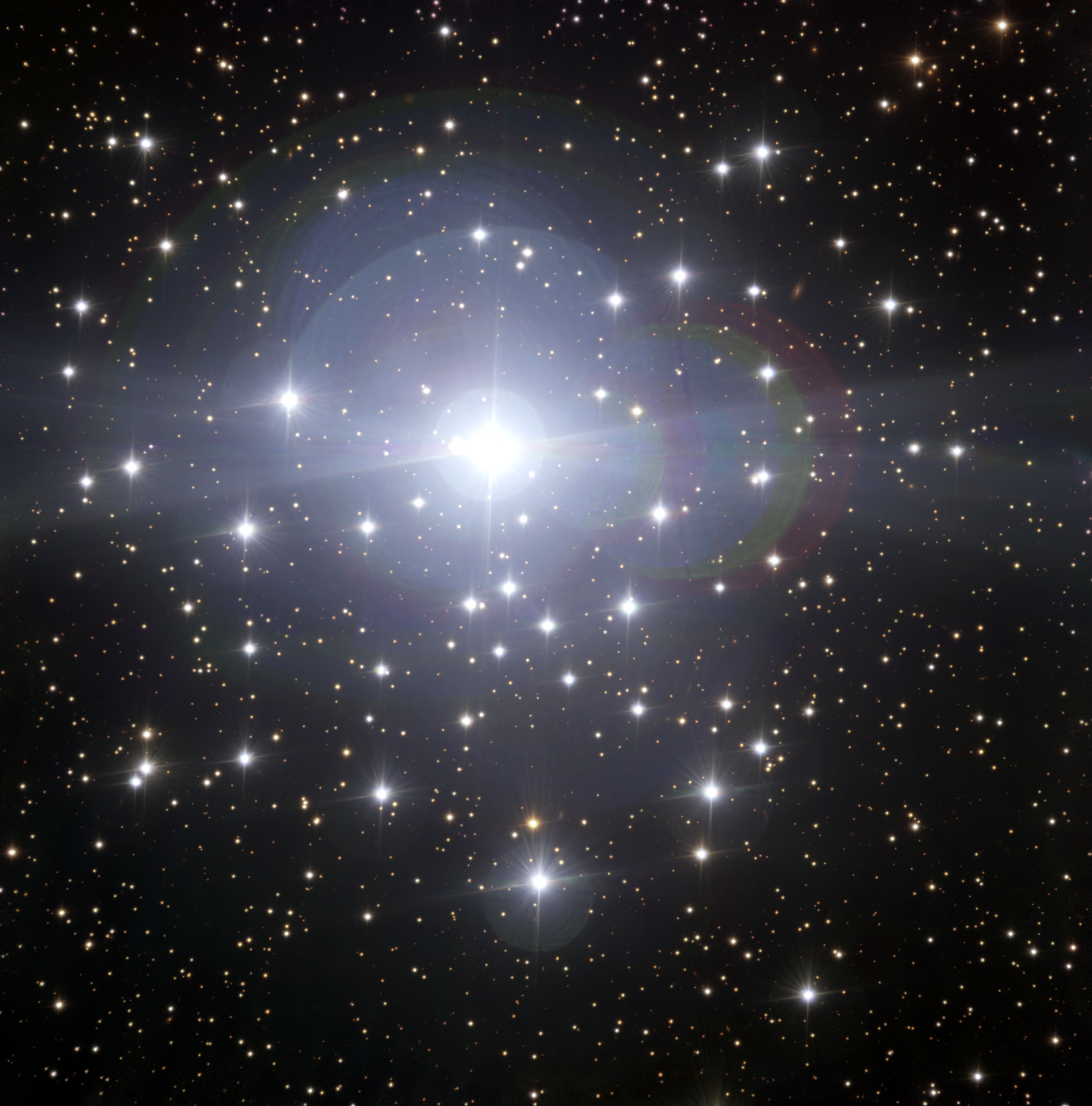
NGC 2362 image created as part of the ESO Cosmic Gems programme.

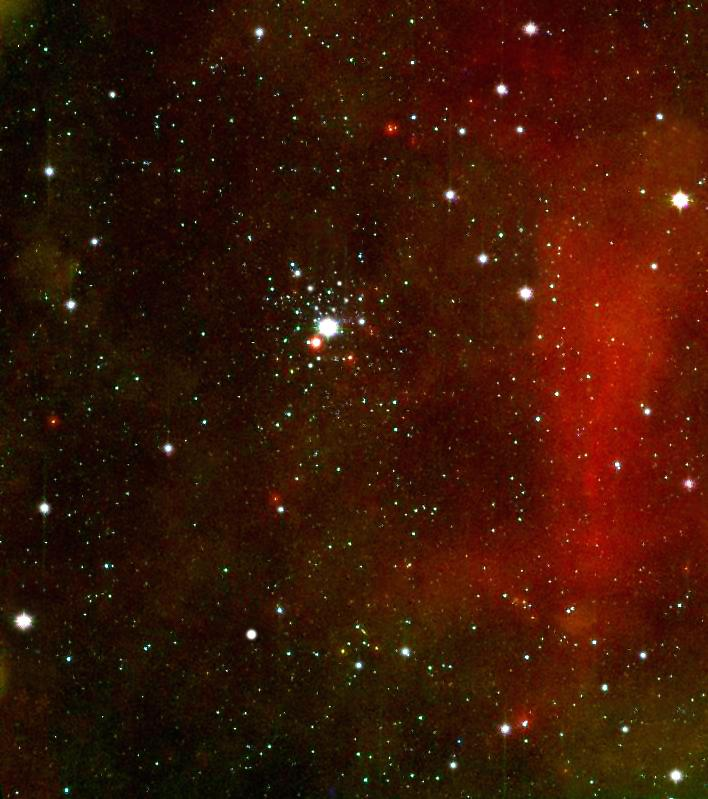
The stars of NGC 2362 surrounding τ CMa (Infrared image taken by the Spitzer Space Telescope)
