= SN 1988Z =

Supernova in the constellation Leo

- Event type: Supernova
- IIn
- Constellation: Leo
- Right ascension: 10^{h} 51^{m} 50.10^{s}
- Declination: +16° 00′ 00.5″
- Epoch: J2000
- Redshift: 0.0225
- Host: MCG +03-28-22
- Peak apparent magnitude: 16.80 (B)

SN 1988Z was a prototypical Type IIn supernova event in the equatorial constellation of Leo. The apparent host is an irregular galaxy with the designation MCG +03-28-22. It has a redshift of z equal to 0.0225. This was a very luminous supernova that faded unusually slowly and has remained detectable three decades after the event. It is one of the most radio and X-ray luminous supernova ever detected, and it has been extensively studied.

== Observations ==
This event was discovered independently, both by C. Pollas at the Côte d'Azur Observatory on a photographic plate taken December 12, 1988, and by G. Candeo at the Asiago Astrophysical Observatory from a plate taken December 14. The supernova was already past maximum when it was discovered. A spectrum taken December 17 showed this was most likely a Type II supernova.

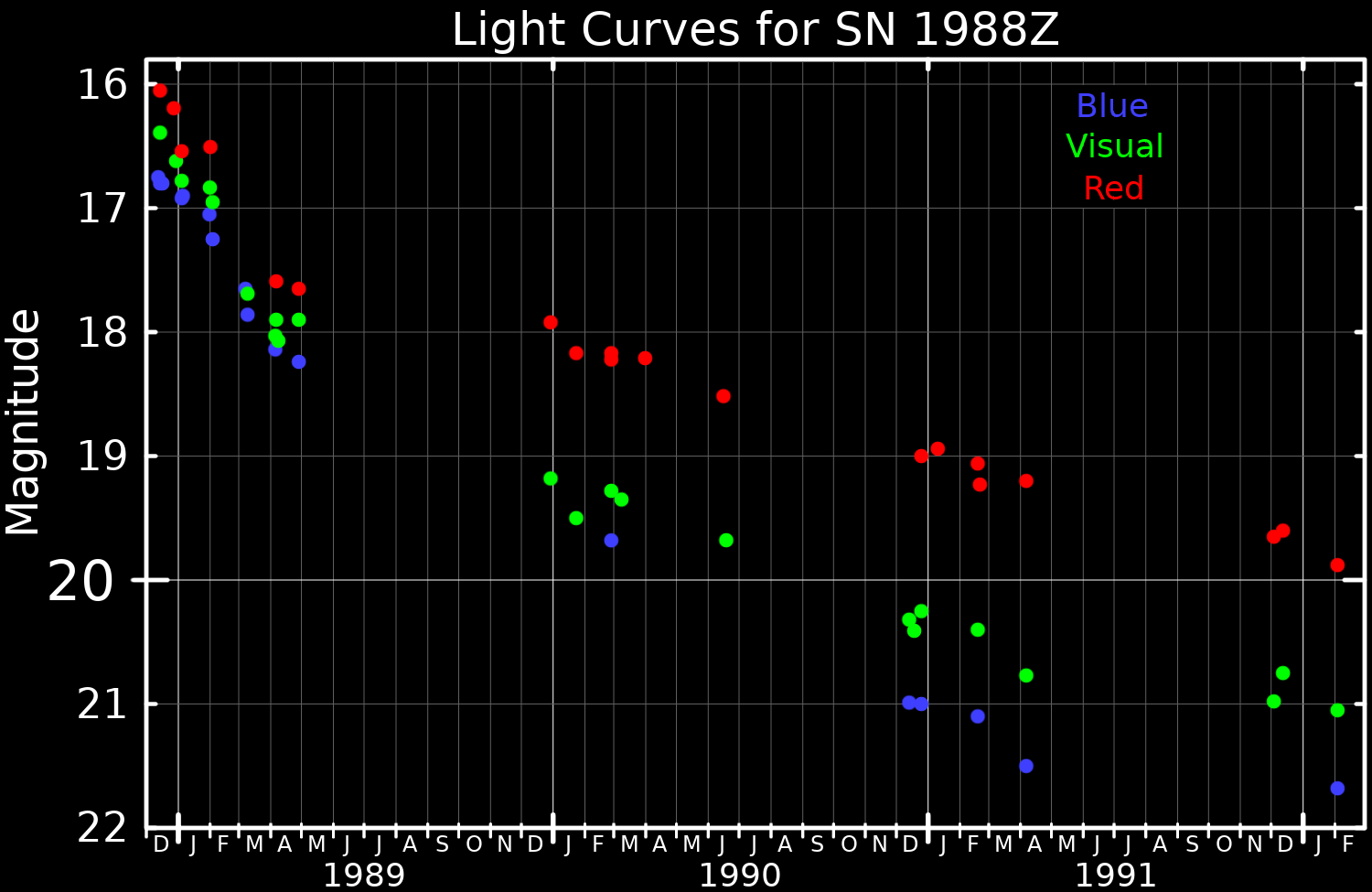
Light curves for SN 1988Z in three photometric bands, Blue, Visual and Red, adapted from Turatto et al.

This supernova displayed a number of unusual characteristics. It was unusually bright at maximum and showed very slow fading. There were strong, narrow emission lines caused by thick circumstellar material. Unlike a typical Type II supernova, no P Cygni profiles or absorption lines were observed. Emission lines of neutral helium were also visible. The spectral lines displayed a complex structure that evolved over time. Decline in the Hydrogen-alpha line strength was unusually slow and lacked an explanation in terms of radioactive decay. The overall picture suggested interaction between the supernova ejecta and a dense circumstellar medium.

A year after the event, radio emission from the supernova was detected using the Very Large Array. The host galaxy shows a redshift of z equal to 0.022, making this the most distant radio supernova detected at that time. It was also one of the most luminous radio supernova discovered. The radio properties indicated a very massive progenitor star in the range of 20–30 M_{☉}. In the late evolutionary stages of the star, it underwent a high rate of mass loss on the order of 10^{−4} M_{☉}·yr^{−1}, which created a dense circumstellar cocoon. In 1996, X-ray emission from the supernova was detected by ROSAT, making it the most distant supernova to be detected in this band. The estimated X-ray luminosity was 10^{41} erg·s^{−1}, which is consistent with a supernova event within dense circumstellar material.

Most studies now favor a model of a very massive progenitor that ejected up to 10 M_{☉} at a rate of around 10^{−3} M_{☉}·yr^{−1} for a period of about 10,000 years prior to the explosion. The mass loss rate ramped up during the final millennium prior to core collapse.
