= Tau Canis Majoris =

Variable star in the constellation Canis Major

- Location of τ CMa (circled)

Observation data Epoch J2000 Equinox ICRS
- Constellation: Canis Major
- Right ascension: 07^{h} 18^{m} 42.48642^{s}
- Declination: −24° 57′ 15.7413″
- Apparent magnitude (V): 4.40; 4.89 (Aa); 5.33 (Ab); 9.70 (E)

Characteristics
- Spectral type: OC8.5 Ib((f)) (Aa1); B0:nn (Aa2a/b); O9.2 II (Ab)
- U−B color index: −0.99
- B−V color index: −0.15
- Variable type: β Lyr (Aa2)

Astrometry
Radial velocity (R_{v})	+33.80 km/s
Proper motion (μ)	RA: −2.31 mas/yr Dec.: +5.02 mas/yr
Parallax (π)	1.09±0.59 mas
Distance	4,900+390 −360 ly (1,500+120 −110 pc)
Absolute magnitude (M_{V})	−5.6

Orbit
Primary	τ CMa Aa
Name	τ CMa Ab
Period (P)	306.8–408.7 years
Semi-major axis (a)	174.1–198.8 mas
Inclination (i)	81.7–82.5°
Longitude of the node (Ω)	297.5–298.9°
Periastron epoch (T)	1949.3–1970.4
Semi-amplitude (K_{1}) (primary)	17.6–20.5 km/s

Orbit
Primary	τ CMa Aa1
Name	τ CMa Aa2
Period (P)	154.900±0.004 days
Eccentricity (e)	0.280±0.005
Inclination (i)	near 90°
Periastron epoch (T)	2,455,098.3±0.4
Argument of periastron (ω) (secondary)	84.3±1.1°
Semi-amplitude (K_{1}) (primary)	87.0±0.5 km/s

Orbit
Primary	τ CMa Aa2a
Name	τ CMa Aa2b
Period (P)	1.282 days

Position (relative to A)
Component	E
Epoch of observation	2018
Angular distance	0.90″
Position angle	87°

Details

τ CMa Aa1
Mass	30 M_{☉}
Radius	17.7 R_{☉}
Luminosity	280,000 L_{☉}
Surface gravity (log g)	3.37 cgs
Temperature	32,514 K
Rotational velocity (v sin i)	90 km/s
Age	3.4 Myr

τ CMa Aa2a
Mass	19 M_{☉}

τ CMa Aa2b
Mass	19 M_{☉}

τ CMa Ab
Mass	25±5 M_{☉}

Other designations
- τ Canis Majoris, 30 Canis Majoris, CD−24°5176, GC 9736, HD 57061, HIP 35415, HR 2782, SAO 173446, ADS 5977, CCDM 07187-2457

Database references
SIMBAD	data

Tau Canis Majoris is a multiple star system in the constellation Canis Major, consisting of five stars. Its name is a Bayer designation that is Latinized from τ Canis Majoris, and abbreviated Tau CMa or τ CMa. This system is approximately 5,000 light years distant from Earth and is the brightest member of the open cluster NGC 2362.

This star is sometimes known as the 'Mexican Jumping Star' by amateur astronomers, because it can appear to 'jump around' with respect to the other stars in the cluster because of its marked contrast in brightness.

== System ==
Aa1
143.86 days
Aa2a
1.282 days
Aa2b
~350 years
Ab
Sep=0.93"
E

Hierarchy of orbits in the τ Canis Majoris system

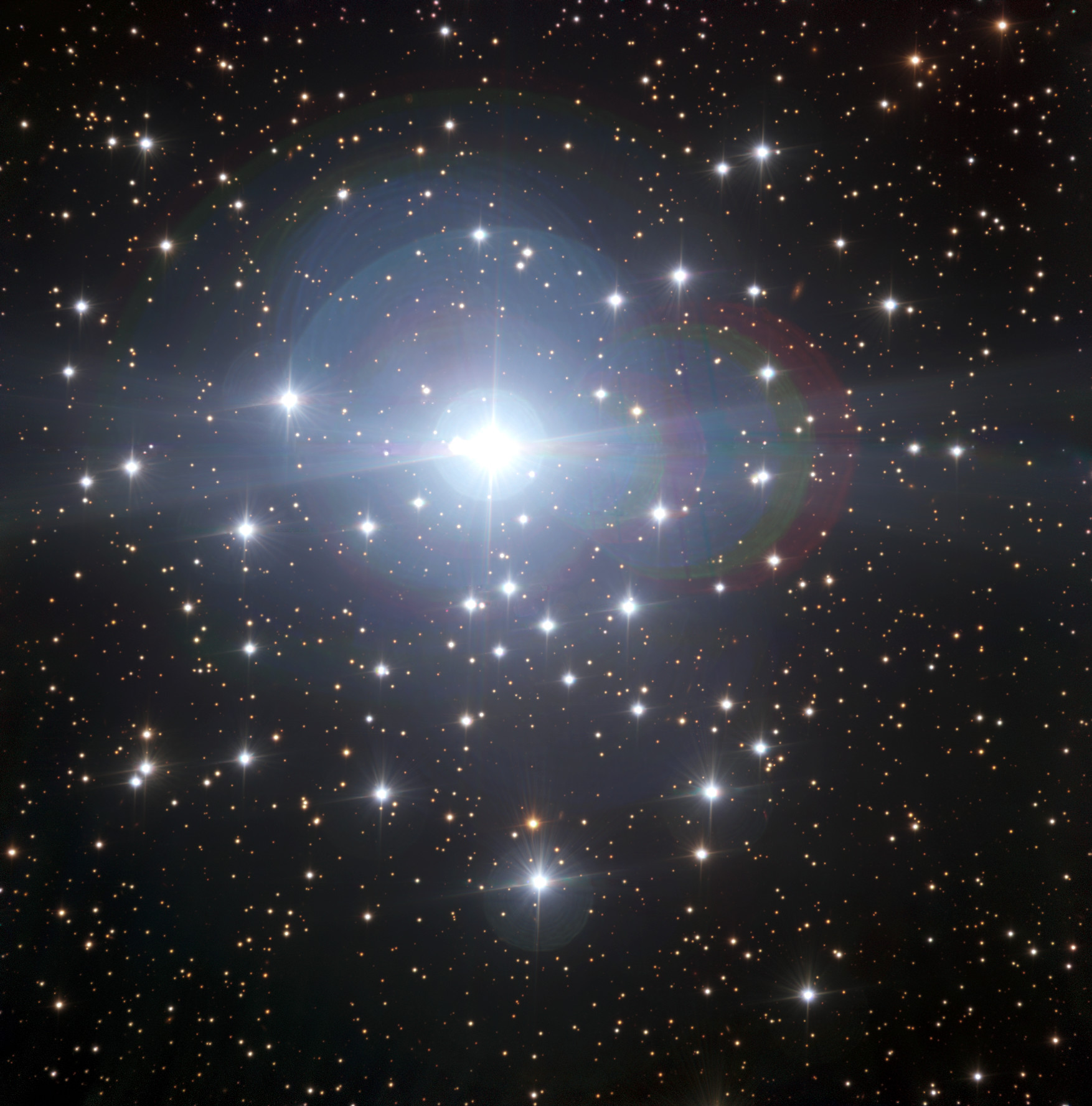
τ CMa at the center of NGC 2362

τ Canis Majoris lies at the center of the very young open cluster NGC 2362, which contains several hundred stars. It is by far the brightest member of the cluster and none of the other members have evolved away from the main sequence.

A number of stars were catalogued by John Herschel as companions of the primary, τ CMa A: component B is a 10th magnitude star 8.6 arc-seconds distant; component C is a 14th magnitude star 14.2 arc-seconds away; and component D is an 8th magnitude star at 85 arc-seconds. These stars are all thought to be main sequence members of NGC 2362. A period of 94,000 years has been suggested for the AB pair assuming they are gravitationally bound.

In 1951, component A was resolved into a double separated by only 0.15". The companion is an O-type bright giant with an orbital period between 300 and 400 years and a mass estimated at 25 times that of the Sun. The Washington Double Star Catalog lists the pair as magnitude 4.89 Aa and magnitude 5.33 Ab, but the CCDM designates the components as A and P. Component E was discovered in 2010; it is less than 1" away from the 4.89 magnitude main component and is 9th magnitude.

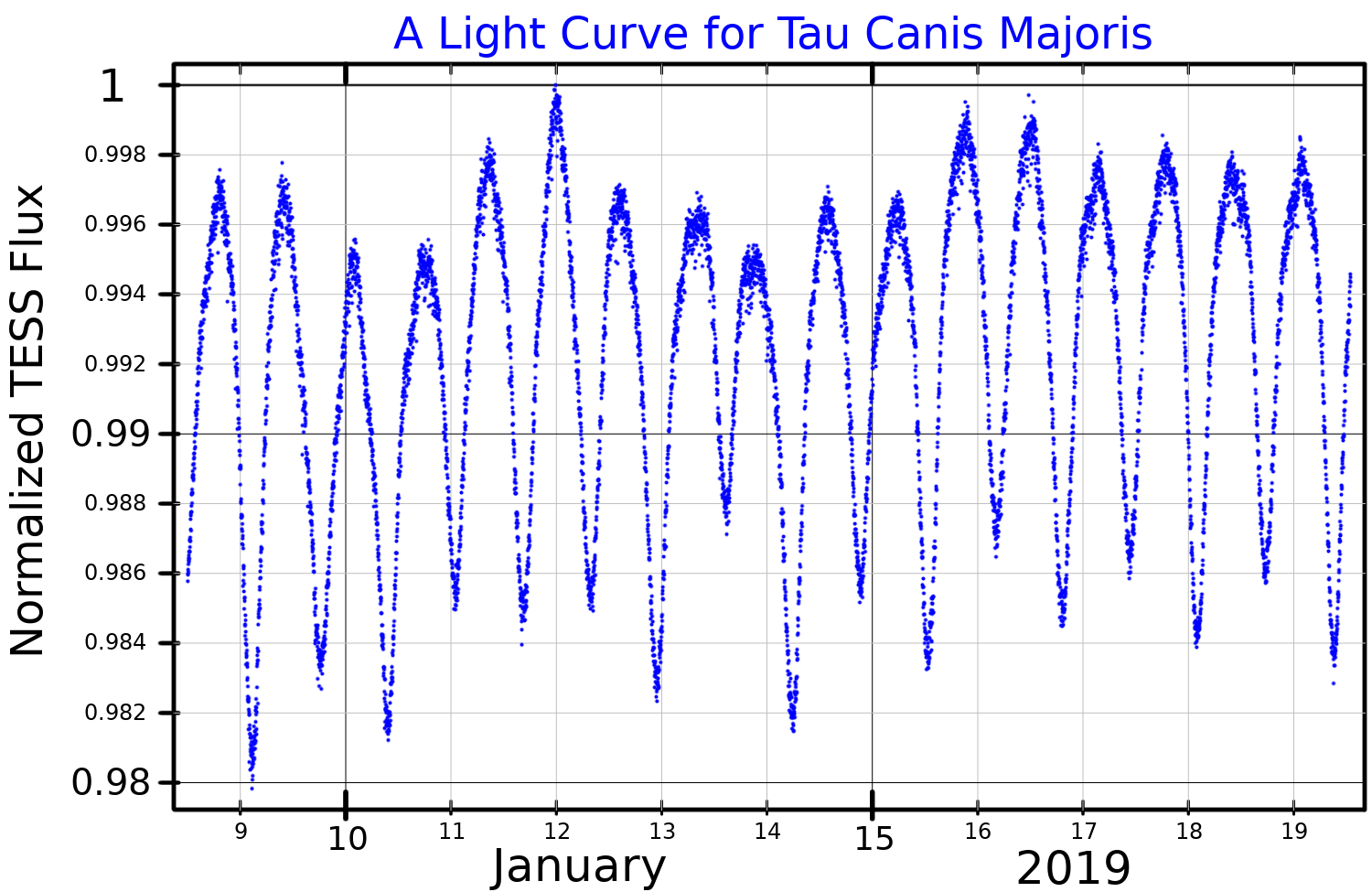
A light curve for Tau Canis Majoris, plotted from TESS data

The primary component A is itself a spectroscopic binary with a period of 154.9 days. Its variable radial velocity was discovered in 1906 and the first orbital elements published in 1928. More recently, Hipparcos satellite data revealed the existence of a 1.282 day eclipsing binary within the system, with two equal minima where the brightness dips by half a magnitude. The eclipsing binary was later revealed to be the secondary component, Aa2, with its subcomponents being named Aa2a and Aa2b.

The spectrum and luminosity are dominated by component Aa which is now considered to be an O8.5 supergiant. It is thought to have a mass around 30 solar masses, a radius 17.7 times that of the Sun, temperature of 32,500 K, and a luminosity 280,000 times that of the Sun. The two eclipsing stars are almost identical, rapidly-rotating B-type stars, with masses of 19 solar masses. They are so close to each other that they share a common envelope, systems with such a characteristic are called overcontact binaries.

The properties of the minor components of the τ CMa grouping are poorly known. Spectral types of B2Vn, B5Vnn, B0.7V and B2: V have been assigned to the components B, C, D and E, respectively. UW Canis Majoris is another 4th magnitude star less than half a degree away, and is itself an eclipsing binary system associated with NGC 2362. It has been catalogued as τ^{2} CMa, but that name is now rarely used.
