= CD Crucis =

Eclipsing binary star system in the constellation Crux

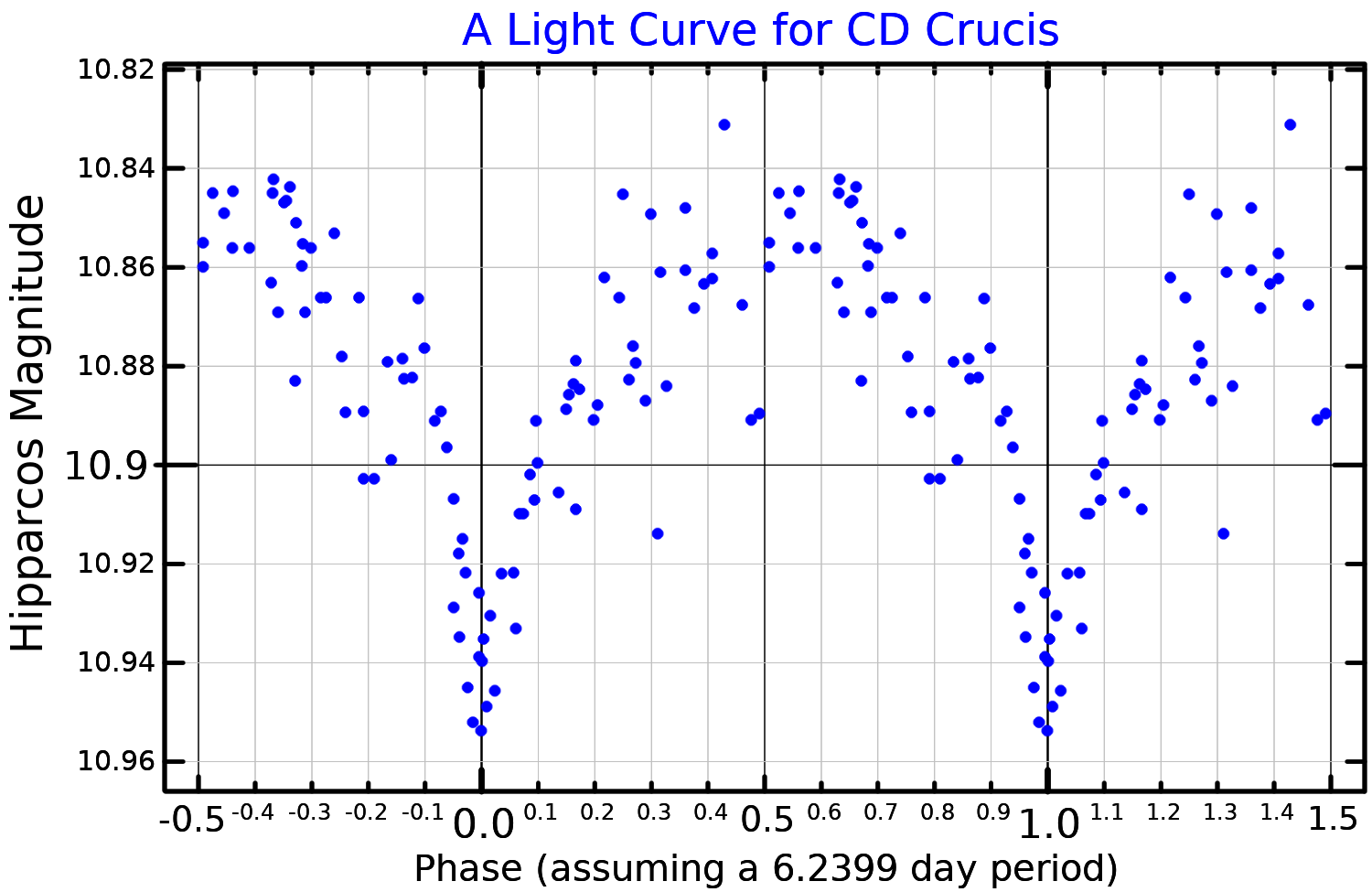
- A light curve for CD Crucis, adapted from Marchenko et al. (1998)

Observation data Epoch J2000 Equinox ICRS
- Constellation: Crux
- Right ascension: 12^{h} 43^{m} 50.99768^{s}
- Declination: −63° 05′ 14.8029″
- Apparent magnitude (V): 10.81 (10.71 - 10.82)

Characteristics
- Spectral type: WN6o + O5V
- U−B color index: −0.19
- B−V color index: +0.83
- Variable type: Eclipsing binary

Astrometry
Radial velocity (R_{v})	8.00 km/s
Proper motion (μ)	RA: −5.921±0.052 mas/yr Dec.: −0.409±0.047 mas/yr
Parallax (π)	0.2336±0.0382 mas
Distance	approx. 14,000 ly (approx. 4,300 pc)
Absolute magnitude (M_{V})	−6.2 (−5.2 + −5.7)

Orbit
Primary	WR
Name	O
Period (P)	6.23930 days
Semi-major axis (a)	0.3010" (68 R_{☉})
Eccentricity (e)	0
Inclination (i)	67 ± 3°
Longitude of the node (Ω)	3.10°
Semi-amplitude (K_{1}) (primary)	263 ± 4 km/s
Semi-amplitude (K_{2}) (secondary)	218 ± 9 km/s

Details

WR
Mass	42.6 ± 3.6 M_{☉}
Radius	5 R_{☉}
Luminosity	127,000 L_{☉}

O
Mass	51.0 ± 2.8 M_{☉}
Radius	12 R_{☉}
Luminosity	880,000 L_{☉}

Other designations
- CD Crucis, HIP 62115, HD 311884, WR 47, 2MASS J12435102-6305148, AAVSO 1238-62

Database references
SIMBAD	data

CD Crucis, also known as HD 311884, is an eclipsing binary star system in the constellation Crux. It is around 14,000 light years away near the faint open cluster Hogg 15. The binary contains a Wolf–Rayet star and is also known as WR 47.

== System ==
CD Cru is composed of two massive and highly luminous stars aligned so that they eclipse each other as they orbit every 6 days and 6 hours. One is a hot blue O-type main sequence star of spectral type O5V that is 57 times as massive as the Sun, while the other is an even hotter Wolf–Rayet star of spectral type WN6 that is 48 times as massive as the Sun. The WR star dominates the spectrum but is less bright, so which star is considered the primary varies. For clarity the components are referred to as WR and O

== Hogg 15 ==
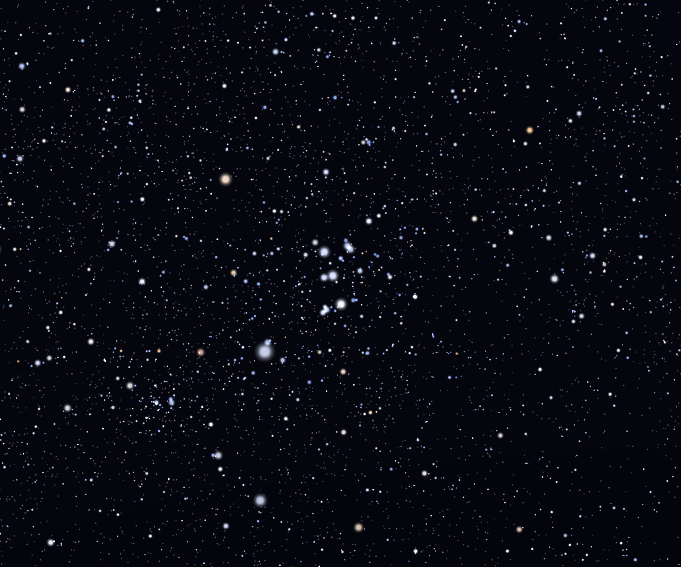
NGC 4609 in the centre and Hogg 15 towards the lower left

Hogg 15 is a small faint open cluster that has been calculated to lie about 4.2 kpc away. CD Cru is considered a likely member of the cluster, in which case it would be the brightest member by over a magnitude. It lies outside the central two arc-minute condensation of the cluster, but well within the outer bounds discovered for the member stars. The cluster is calculated to be only eight million years old.

The brighter and closer cluster NGC 4609 lies 10 arc-minutes away, and both clusters are near the centre of the dark Coalsack Nebula. Both clusters are actually more distant than the Coalsack so are seen through it rather than against it. It suffers 3.5 magnitudes of interstellar extinction. Between the two clusters lies the 5th magnitude BZ Crucis, a much closer foreground object.

== Properties ==
The WR component is five times the radius of the sun, but its high temperature means it is over 100,000 times more luminous. Its mass is determined from the orbital motion to be 42.6 M_{☉}.

The O star is larger at 12 R_{☉}, more luminous at 880,000 L_{☉}, and more massive at 51 M_{☉}. Although the stars are only separated by around 68 R_{☉}, they are well separated because of their small size.
