= QWR =

QWR or qWR may refer to:

- Qualification World Record in athletics
- Quarter wave resonator, a type of microwave cavity
- Quasi Wolf–Rayet, a type of star - see HD 45166
- Queen's Westminster Rifles, a British territorial army regiment
