= HD 164270 =

Wolf–Rayet star

Observation data Epoch J2000.0 Equinox ICRS
- Constellation: Sagittarius
- Right ascension: 18^{h} 01^{m} 43.145^{s}
- Declination: −32° 42′ 55.16″
- Apparent magnitude (V): 8.74

Characteristics
- Evolutionary stage: Wolf–Rayet
- Spectral type: WC
- Apparent magnitude (G): 8.56

Astrometry
| Proper motion (μ) | RA: +1.724±0.024 mas/yr Dec.: −0.640±0.016 mas/yr |
| Parallax (π) | 0.3696±0.0243 mas |
| Distance | 8,800 ± 600 ly (2,700 ± 200 pc) |
| Absolute magnitude (M_{V}) | −4.6 |

Details
| Mass | 6 M_{☉} |
| Radius | 4.1 R_{☉} |
| Luminosity | 79,000 L_{☉} |
| Temperature | 48,000 K |

Other designations
- Hen 3-1555, V4072 Sgr, CD−32°13623, HD 164270, HIP 88287, SAO 209609, TIC 265405113, TYC 7395-31-1, IRAS 17584-3243, 2MASS J18014314−3242551, Gaia DR3 4042922573453831936

Database references
| SIMBAD | data |

HD 164270, (also known as WR 103 or V4072 Sagittarii), is a Wolf–Rayet star of the carbon subtype (WC) located in the constellation of Sagittarius. The star exhibits low-amplitude photometric and radial velocity variations with a period of 1.754 days, interpreted as arising from a single-line spectroscopic binary system containing a low-mass companion, possibly a neutron star. It has experienced occasional dramatic fading events of nearly 1 magnitude, though these are not definitively linked to eclipses.

== Observation ==
As a late-type carbon-rich Wolf–Rayet star, HD 164270 displays broad emission lines dominated by carbon and oxygen in its spectrum, indicative of a strong stellar wind. Models accounting for line blanketing and wind clumping yield an effective temperature of approximately 48,000 K, a luminosity of about 79,400 times that of the Sun (log(L/L_{☉}) ≈ 4.9), and a mass-loss rate of roughly 10^{−5} M_{☉}/yr for a volume filling factor of 0.1. The terminal wind velocity is around 1,400 km/s. Abundances derived from optical and mid-infrared diagnostics include C/He ≈ 0.2 and O/He ≈ 0.01 by number, with neon and sulfur abundances elevated relative to solar values (Ne/He ≈ 2.2×10^{−3} and S/He ≈ 5.1×10^{−5}).

== Variability ==
HD 164270 displays cyclic photometric variations with a period of 1.75404 days and an amplitude of ~0.03 magnitude in the visible (increasing at shorter wavelengths), manifesting as a double-wave light curve per cycle. Emission-line radial velocities vary with a single wave per cycle and low amplitude (~20–30 km/s), consistent with orbital motion in a binary system.

In addition to these short-period variations, the star has undergone rare, deep fading events, including drops of nearly 1 magnitude observed in June 1980 and September 1909. The 1980 event showed no color change, and archival plate analysis limits possible periods for recurrence to 17.7, 35.4, or 70.8 years. These events may represent partial eclipses by a large, cool companion or could arise from alternative mechanisms such as a precessing accretion disk influenced by a third body, or nonradial pulsations. No definitive eclipses have been confirmed in the short-period binary orbit.
