= WR 120 =

Binary star system in the constellation Scutum

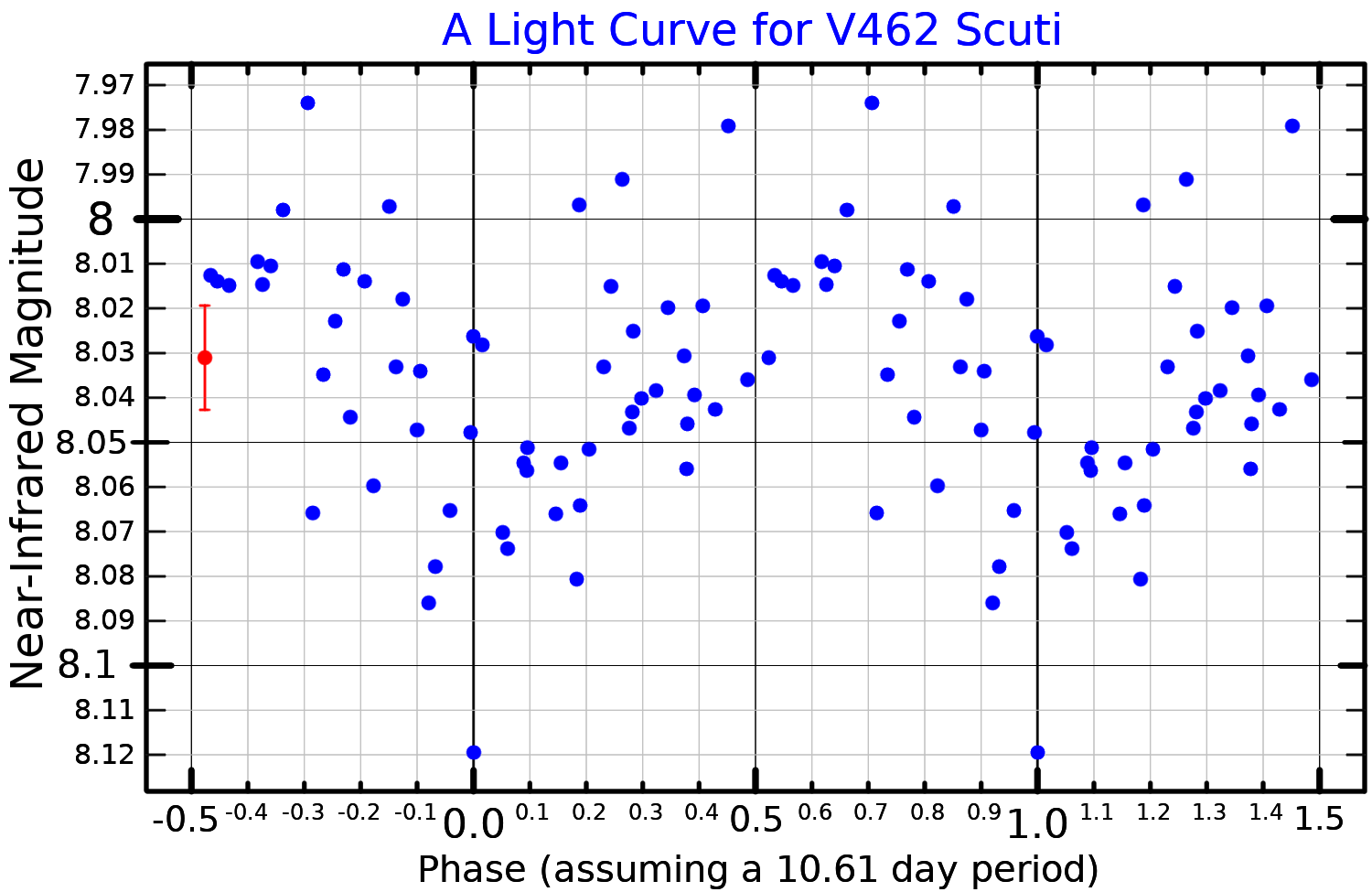
- A near-infrared (2.033 micron) light curve for V462 Scuti, adapted from Chené and St-Louis (2007). The left-most point shows the 3 sigma error bar.

Observation data Epoch J2000 Equinox J2000
- Constellation: Scutum
- Right ascension: 18^{h} 41^{m} 00.86701^{s}
- Declination: −04° 26′ 14.4841″
- Apparent magnitude (V): 11.93

Characteristics
- Evolutionary stage: Wolf–Rayet
- Spectral type: WN7w + WN3/4
- U−B color index: 0.13
- B−V color index: 1.04

Astrometry
Proper motion (μ)	RA: −0.489 mas/yr Dec.: −2.524 mas/yr
Parallax (π)	0.3246±0.0541 mas
Distance	approx. 10,000 ly (approx. 3,100 pc)
Absolute magnitude (M_{V})	−3.81

Details
Mass	7 M_{☉}
Radius	3.78 R_{☉}
Luminosity	83,200 L_{☉}
Temperature	50,100 K

Other designations
- MR 89, V462 Scuti, 2MASS J18410086-0426145

Database references
SIMBAD	data

WR 120 is a binary containing two Wolf–Rayet stars in the constellation of Scutum, around 10,000 light years away. The primary is a hydrogen-free weak-lined WN7 star, the secondary is a hydrogen-free WN3 or 4 star, and the system is a possible member of the cluster Dolidze 33. From our point of view, WR 120 is reddened by 4.82 magnitudes.

Photometric observations obtained in 1995 by Sergey V. Marchenko et al. showed that WR 120 is a variable star. For that reason it was given its variable star designation, V462 Scuti, in the year 2000.

== Properties ==
Analysis of the primary's spectrum with PoWR shows that it has a temperature of around 50,000 Kelvins, and is losing mass at a rate of 10^{−4.9} M_{☉}/year, or 1 solar mass every 80,000 years, which is being carried away from the surface at a speed of 1,225 kilometres per second. Taking its close distance into account, WR 120 A's luminosity turns out to be a mere 83,200 L_{☉}, which would make it one of the dimmest WN stars known, and one of the only WN stars with a luminosity below 100,000 L_{☉}. Using the Stefan-Boltzmann Law, a radius of 3.78 R_{☉} is derived, and a "transformed" radius at an optical depth of 2/3, more comparable to other types of stars, is about 6 R_{☉}. Using the WR luminosity-mass ratio, WR 120 may have a mass of just 7 M_{☉}, one of the lowest masses of any WR star. WR 120's absolute magnitude is −3.8, which is also relatively faint for a Wolf–Rayet star.

WR 120 is thought to be a member of Dolidze 33, an open cluster nearly 3,000 pc away.

== Binarity ==
In 2021, WR 120 was found to have a close companion. Previously, it was thought to be a single WR star. The companion is thought to be a WN3/4 WR star and would be located at least 1,700 AU from the primary WN7 WR star. It is about two magnitudes fainter than WR 120.
