= NGC 1501 =

Planetary nebula in the constellation Camelopardalis

Emission nebula
- Planetary nebula
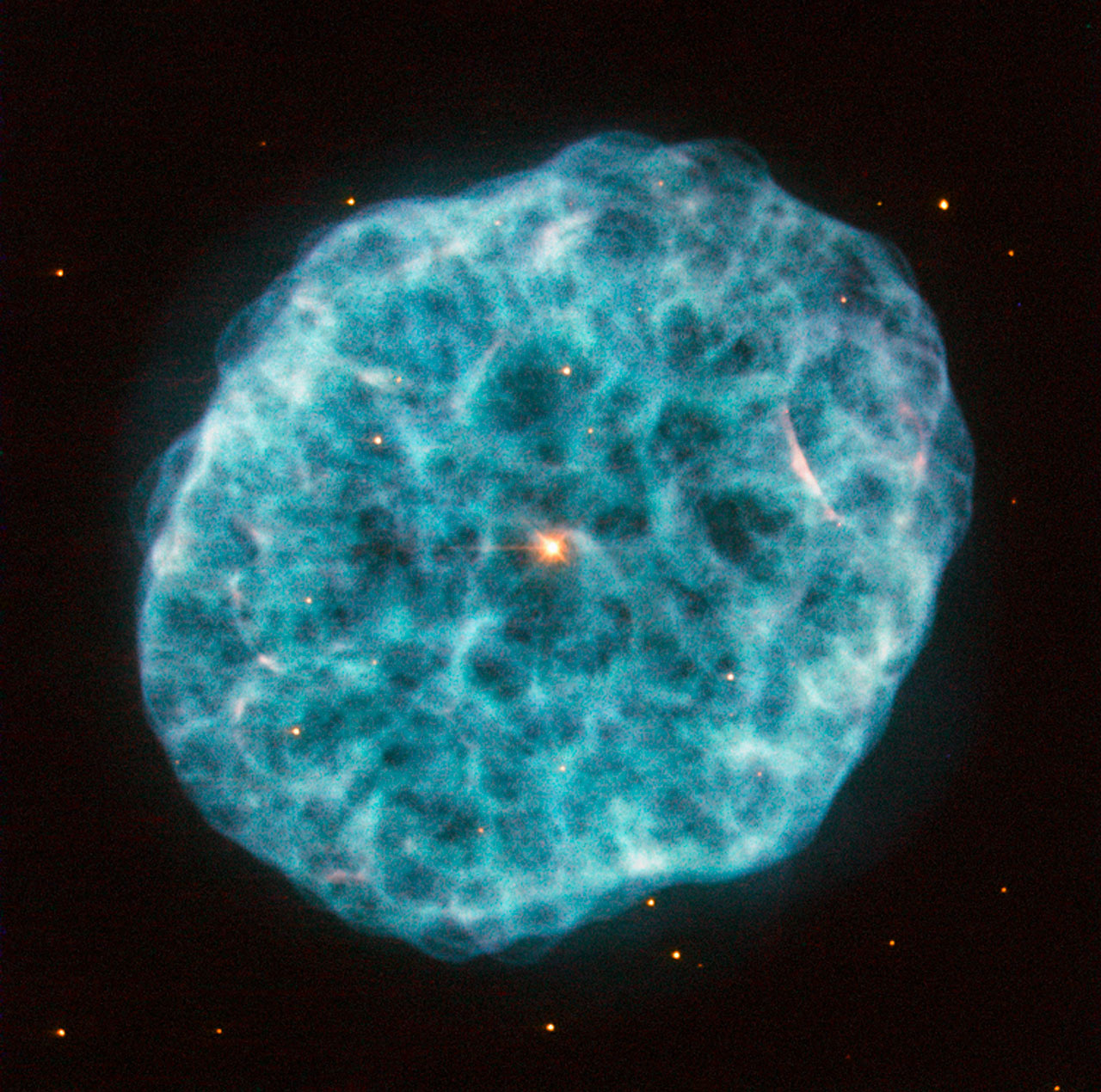
- False color image of NGC 1501. The central star is visible in the middle.

Observation data: J2000 epoch
- Right ascension: 04^{h} 06^{m} 59.392^{s}
- Declination: +60° 55′ 14.28″
- Distance: 3,840 ± 770 ly (1.177 ± 0.236 kpc) ly
- Apparent magnitude (V): 13.3
- Apparent diameter: 52″
- Constellation: Camelopardalis

Physical characteristics
- Radius: 0.5 ly
- Designations: PK 144+6.1, PN G144.5+06.5, CS 14.4, CH Cam

NGC 1501, also known as the Blue Oyster Nebula, is a planetary nebula with a complex structure, located in the northern constellation of Camelopardalis. It has the proper names Camel's Eye Nebula and the Oyster Nebula. The nebula was discovered on 27 August 1787 by the British-German astronomer William Herschel. The central star of NGC 1501 is located at a distance of approximately 3,840 light-years (1.177 kpc) from the Sun, and is 29,280 light-years (8.978 kpc) from the Galactic Center.

== Properties ==
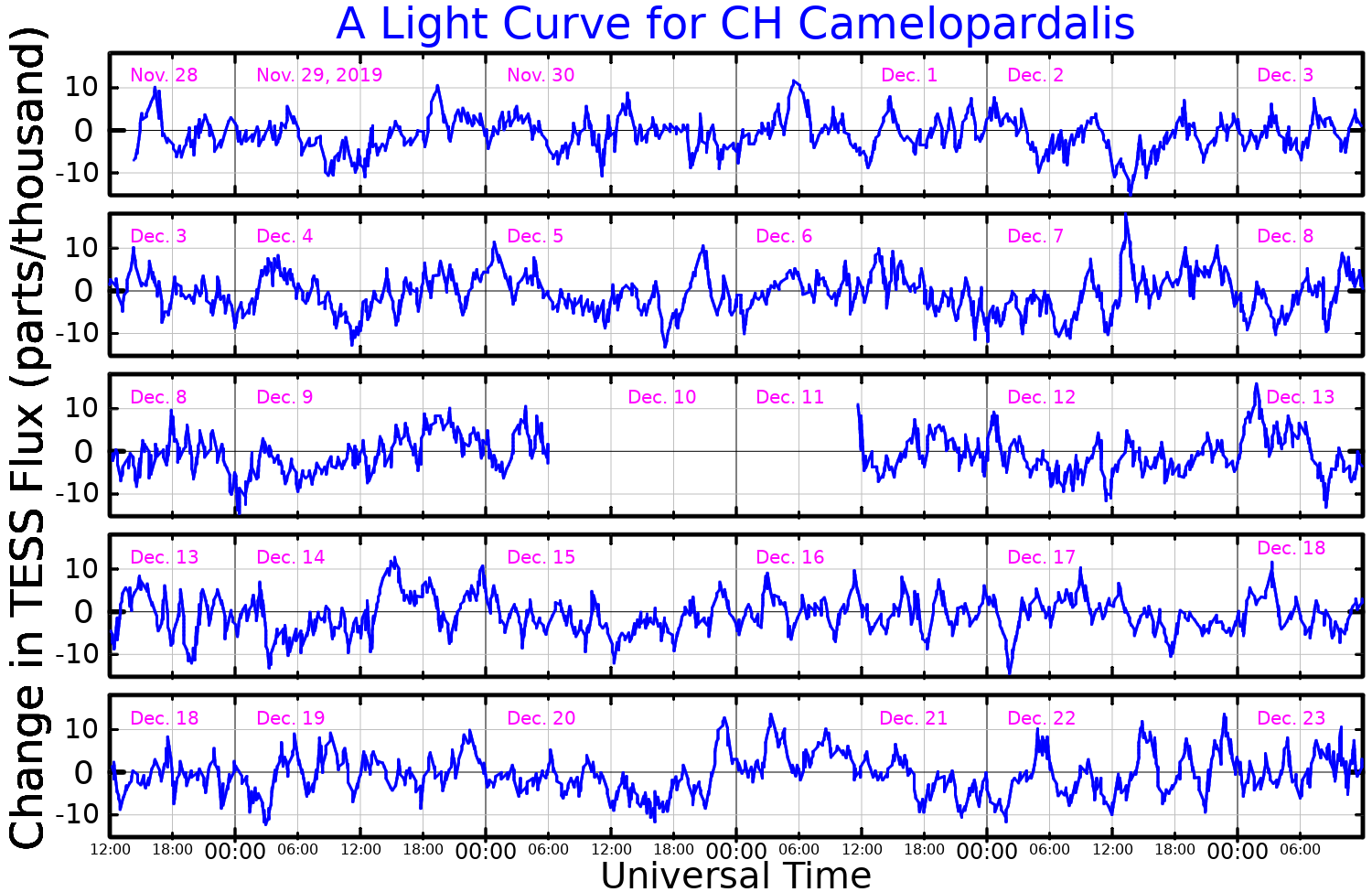
A TESS light curve for CH Camelopardalis, adapted from Córsico et al., (2021)

Designated CH Camelopardalis, the central star of this planetary nebula has a spectral type of [WC4], similar to that of a carbon-rich Wolf–Rayet star. It is a pulsating star, meaning that its brightness varies regularly and periodically. In the case of NGC 1501's progenitor star, this is incredibly fast, with the star's brightness changing significantly in just half an hour. An analysis of Gaia data suggests that the central star is a binary system.

The overall shape of the nebula is close to a thin-shelled oblate spheroid, with a low to moderate ellipticity. The major axis spans an angular size of 44″. There are a large lobes along the axes, with smaller bumps scattered across the surface. The three dimensional form has been described as a "boiling, tetra-lobed shell". Visible-light observations capture the glow of gases including hydrogen and nitrogen. Density peaks have a particle densities of up to 1,400 cm^{−3}. The temperature of the free electrons in the nebula measured at up to 11,500 K, and the nebula turbulence is 18 km/s.

The total mass of the nebula is estimated to be around 0.22 M_{☉}, most of which is ionized gas (0.21 M_{☉}) and a small fraction (8.9×10^{−4} M_{☉}) is carbon-rich dust. Expansion velocities range from 38 to 55 km/s. The estimated mass of the central star prior to entering the asymptotic giant branch stage and shedding its outer layer was 0.80–0.88 M_{☉}.

== Gallery ==
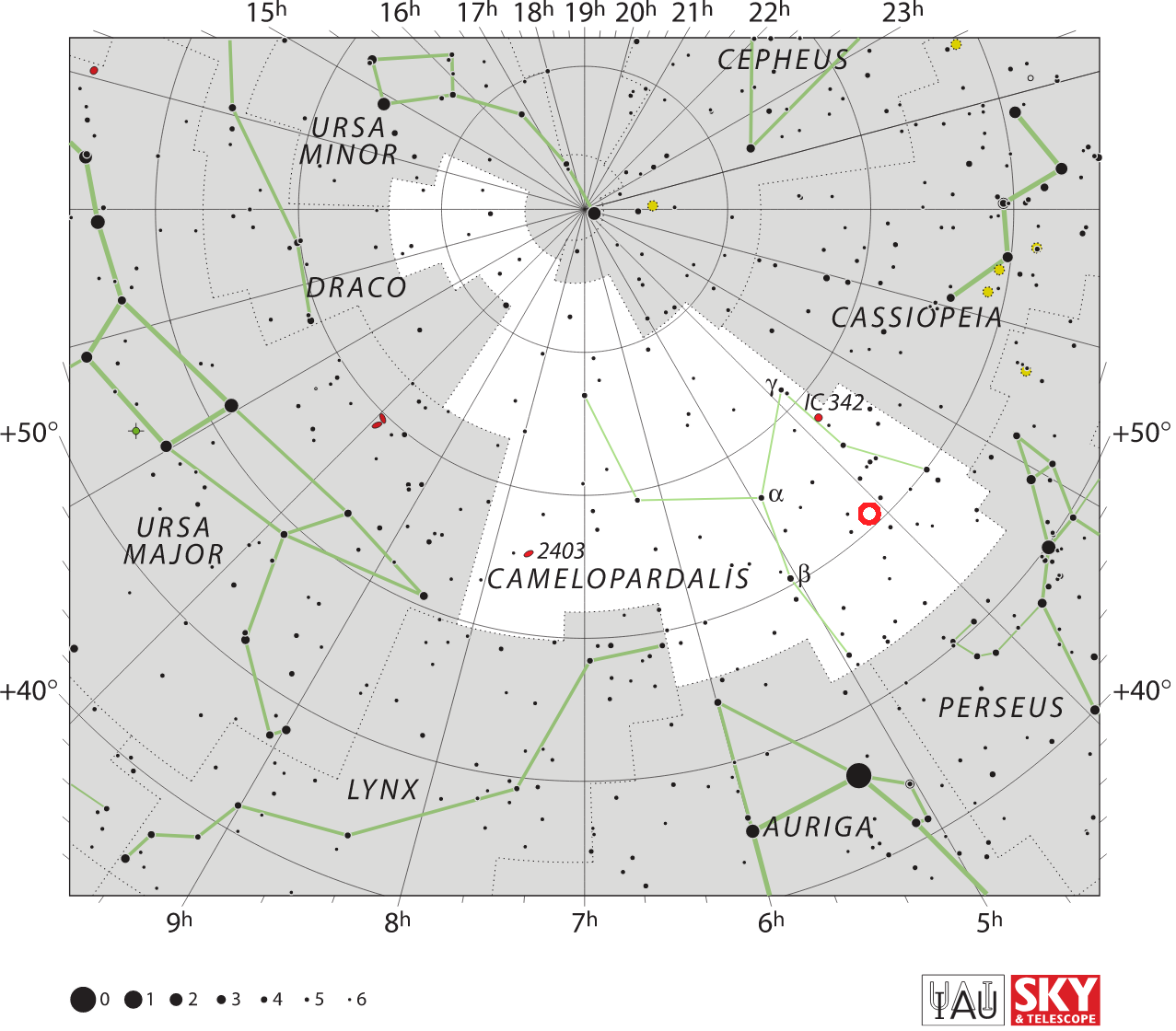
The location of NGC 1501 (circled in red)

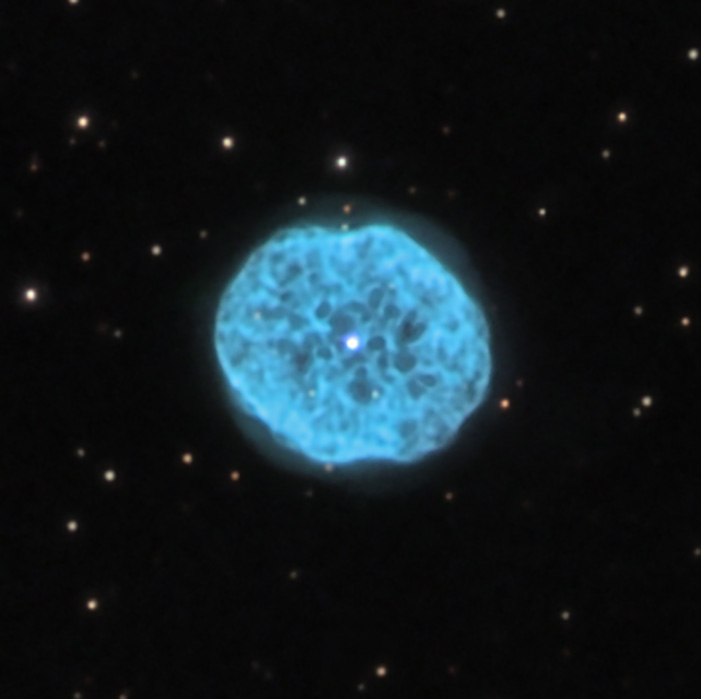
NGC 1501 from the 0.8m Schulman Telescope at the Mount Lemmon SkyCenter
