= WR 86 =

Visual binary star system

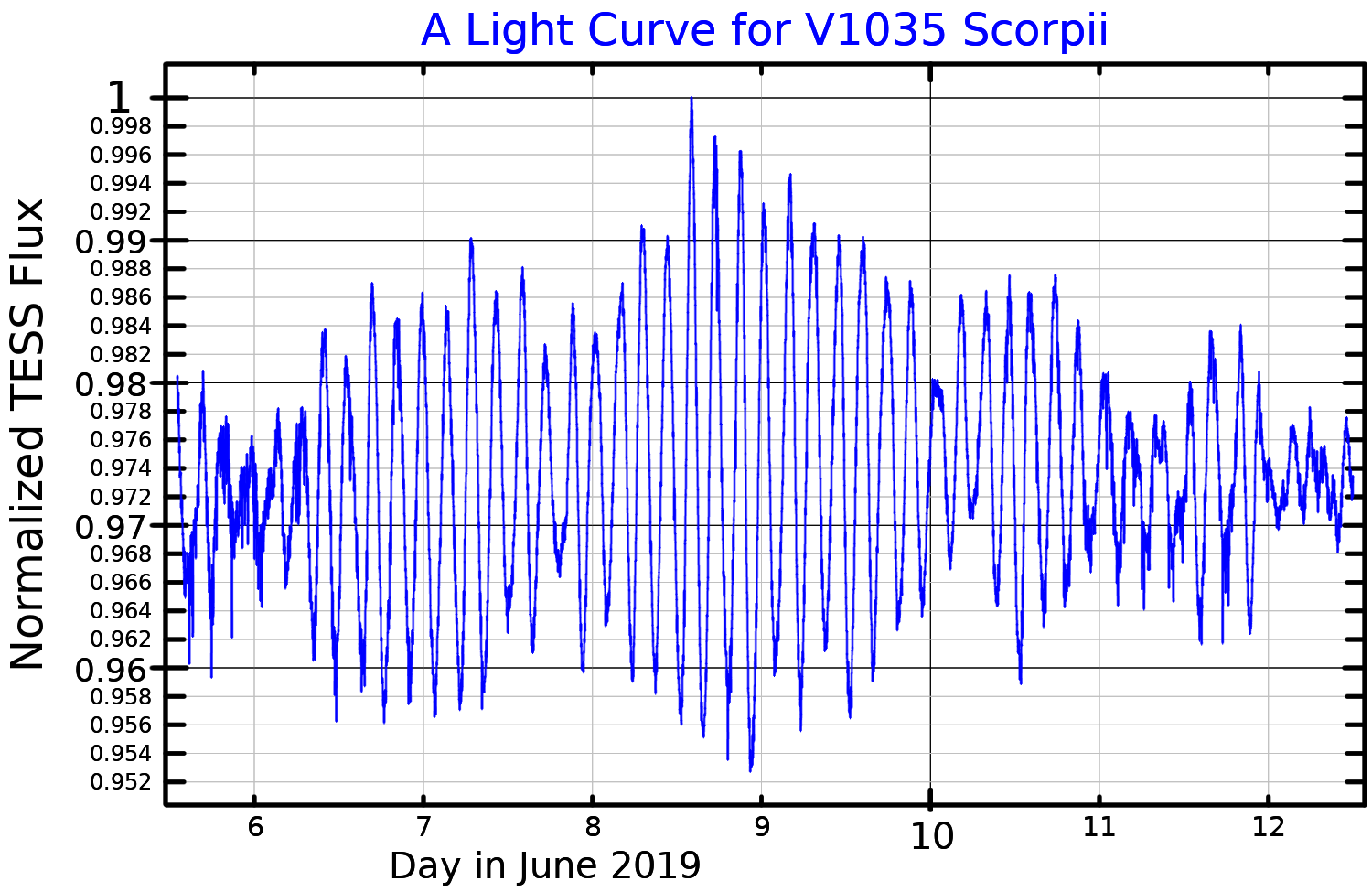
- A light curve for V1035 Scorpii, plotted from TESS data

Observation data Epoch J2000.0 Equinox J2000.0
- Constellation: Scorpius
- Right ascension: 17^{h} 18^{m} 23.06137^{s}
- Declination: −34° 24′ 30.6308″
- Apparent magnitude (V): 9.27

Characteristics
- Evolutionary stage: Wolf-Rayet star
- Spectral type: WC7 + B0III
- Apparent magnitude (J): 7.436
- Apparent magnitude (K): 6.666
- U−B color index: −0.07
- B−V color index: +0.63
- Variable type: β Cep

Astrometry
| Proper motion (μ) | RA: −0.92 mas/yr Dec.: −4.80 mas/yr |
| Parallax (π) | 1.84±1.62 mas |
| Distance | 2,100±800 pc |
| Absolute magnitude (M_{V}) | −4.3 + −4.3 |

Details

WR
| Mass | ~12 M_{☉} |
| Radius | 10 R_{☉} |
| Luminosity | 200,000 L_{☉} |
| Temperature | 56,000 K |

B
| Mass | 19 M_{☉} |
| Luminosity | 63,000 L_{☉} |
| Temperature | 31,405 K |
| Age | 4.0 Myr |

Other designations
- V1035 Scorpii, CD−34°11622, HD 156327, HIP 84655, WDS J17184-3425, 2MASS J17182306−3424306

Database references
| SIMBAD | data |

WR 86 is a visual binary in the constellation Scorpius consisting of a Wolf-Rayet star and a β Cephei variable. It lies 2° west of NGC 6357 on the edge of the Great Rift in the Milky Way in the tail of the Scorpion.

WR 86 is a binary with two components of equal visual brightness 0.3" apart. One has the emission-line spectrum of a WC7 Wolf-Rayet star, while the other is a B0 giant. Peter Monderen et al. discovered that the star is a variable star, in April 1986. It was given its variable star designation, V1035 Scorpii, in 1997. The blue giant varies slightly in brightness every 3.5 hours. The WR star may also be slightly variable.

The pulsations of the B-type giant are characteristic of a β Cephei variable. Analysis of its pulsations and comparison to the expected properties of a WC7 star suggest that both stars could have evolved without mass exchange. The WR and B stars would have had initial masses of 40 M_{☉} and 20 M_{☉} respectively four million years ago.
