= Theta Muscae =

Star in the constellation Musca

- Location of θ Mus (red circled)

Observation data Epoch J2000 Equinox ICRS
- Constellation: Musca
- Right ascension: 13^{h} 08^{m} 07.15286^{s}
- Declination: −65° 18′ 21.6819″
- Apparent magnitude (V): 5.53 (5.662 + 7.555)

Characteristics

θ Mus A
- Spectral type: WC5/6 + O6/7V + O9.5/B0Iab
- U−B color index: −0.91
- B−V color index: −0.43
- Variable type: Eclipsing + WR

B
- Spectral type: O9III
- U−B color index: −0.90
- B−V color index: −0.055

Astrometry
Radial velocity (R_{v})	−28.4 km/s
Proper motion (μ)	RA: −3.977 mas/yr Dec.: −1.830 mas/yr
Parallax (π)	0.4921±0.0336 mas
Distance	6,600 ± 500 ly (2,000 ± 100 pc)
Absolute magnitude (M_{V})	−6.2

Orbit
Period (P)	19.1375 d
Eccentricity (e)	0.00 (assumed)
Inclination (i)	49±6°
Semi-amplitude (K_{1}) (primary)	221±6 km/s

Details

Aa
Mass	<11.5 M_{☉}
Luminosity	234,000 L_{☉}

Ab
Mass	44 M_{☉}
Luminosity	295,000 L_{☉}

B
Radius	10.82+0.90 −0.50 R_{☉}
Surface gravity (log g)	3.39+0.73 −0.33 cgs
Temperature	20,213+970 −241 K
Metallicity [Fe/H]	0.014±0.001 dex

Other designations
- Theta Muscae, CD−64°699, HR 4952, HD 113904, HIP 64094, GSC 08997-02337, SAO 252162, PPM 359890, GC 17788, UCAC3 50-186265, IRAS 13048−6502, WR 48

Database references
SIMBAD	data

Theta Muscae (θ Muscae) is a multiple star system in the southern constellation Musca ("the Fly"), containing a Wolf-Rayet star and two massive companions. With an apparent magnitude of 5.5, it is the second-brightest Wolf–Rayet star in the sky, although much of the visual brightness comes from the massive companions and it is not one of the closest of its type.

== Description ==
Theta muscae (Red circled)

Theta Muscae is a remote triple star system, the primary component of which is a carbon-sequence Wolf–Rayet star. This is a variety of highly-luminous hot blue star that has blown off its hydrogen envelope and is emitting heavier elements, in this case carbon, amid a strong stellar wind. Theta Muscae is the second-brightest such star in the sky after Gamma Velorum in Vela. θ Mus is beyond the current reach of useful visual parallax measurements, but has been estimated as around 7,400 light-years (460 million astronomical units) from Earth. While cataloging the stars in the far-southern sky, French explorer and astronomer Nicolas-Louis de Lacaille gave the star its Bayer designation in 1756.

== Triple system ==
The triple star θ Muscae A is composed of two parts: a spectroscopic binary system composed of the Wolf–Rayet star (spectral type: WC5 or 6) and an O-type main-sequence star (spectral type: O6 or O7) that orbit each other every 19 days and a blue supergiant (spectral type: O9.5/B0Iab) set about 46 milliarcseconds apart from them. If the system's estimated distance from Earth is accurate, the binary stars are about 0.5 AU apart and the supergiant about 100 AU apart from them. Although the Wolf–Rayet star dominates the spectrum, it is visually only about a quarter of the brightness of the supergiant companion. All three are highly luminous: combined, they are likely to be over a million times as luminous as the Sun. The stellar winds of the Wolf–Rayet star and its close companion are so powerful that they form a shock front where they meet. The front produces X-rays.

== Nebula ==
A surrounding emission nebula is now thought to be a supernova remnant, not directly connected to θ Muscae.
