= Melnick 42 =

Massive blue supergiant star in the constellation Dorado

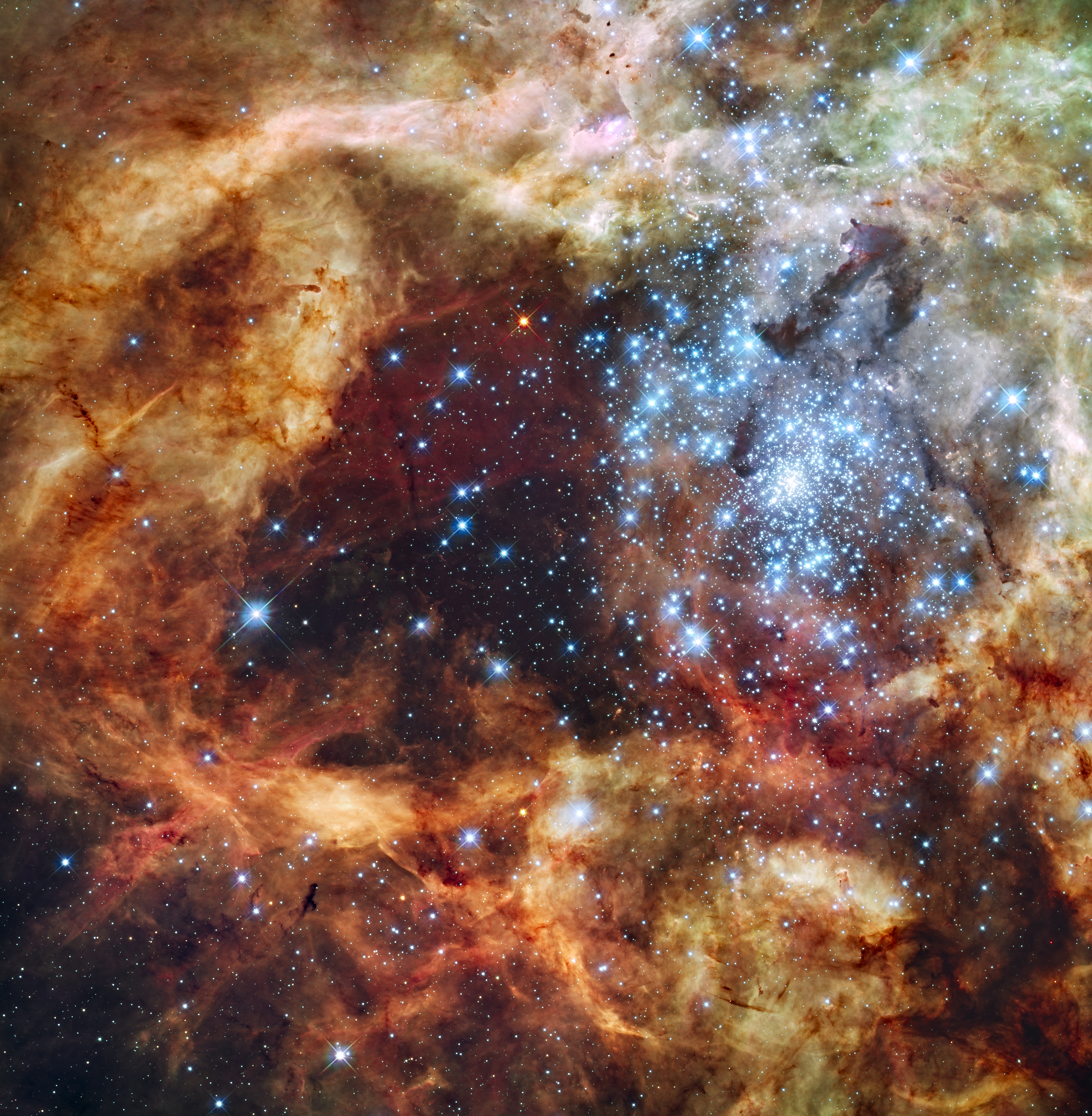
- Melnick 42 (annotated in Commons); Credit: Hubble Space Telescope

Observation data Epoch J2000 Equinox ICRS
- Constellation: Dorado
- Right ascension: 05^{h} 38^{m} 42.12^{s}
- Declination: −69° 05′ 55.2″
- Apparent magnitude (V): 12.78

Characteristics
- Spectral type: O2If^{*}
- B−V color index: +0.08

Astrometry
Radial velocity (R_{v})	173 km/s
Distance	163,000 ly (49,970 pc)
Absolute magnitude (M_{V})	−7.4

Details
Mass	189 M_{☉}
Radius	21.1 R_{☉}
Luminosity	3,600,000 L_{☉}
Surface gravity (log g)	3.90 cgs
Temperature	47,300 K
Rotational velocity (v sin i)	240 km/s
Age	~1 million years

Other designations
- MK42, Brey 77, BAT99 105, 2MASS J05384212-6905552

Database references
SIMBAD	data

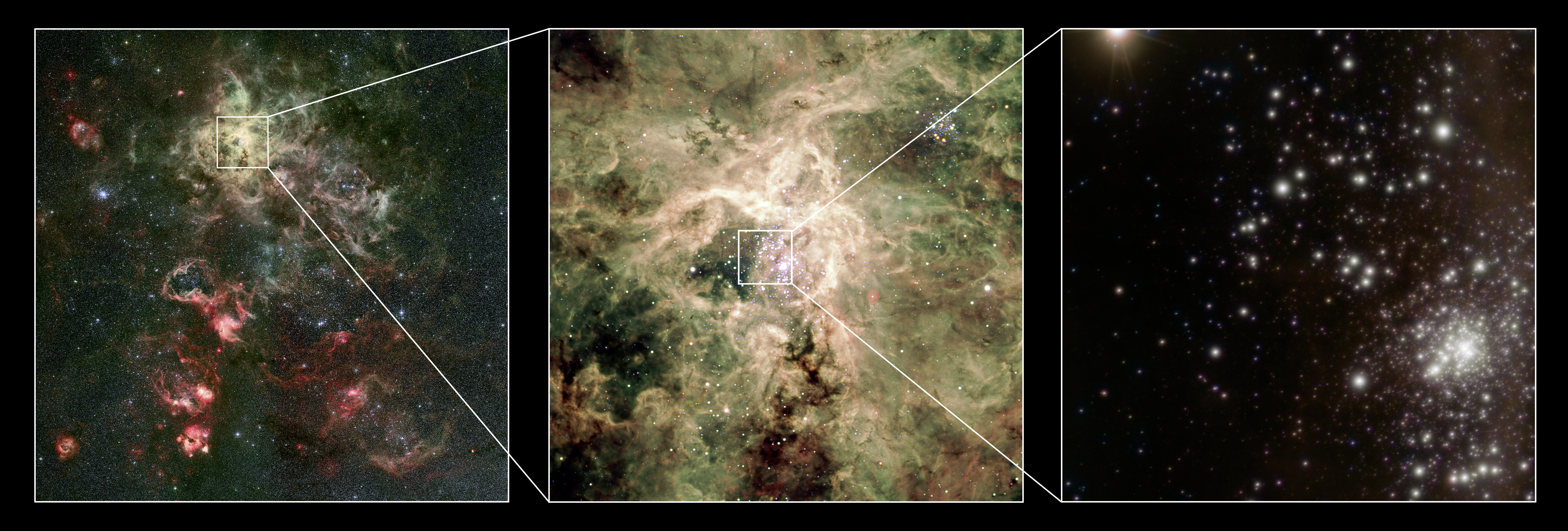
The RMC 136 cluster. Melnick 42 is just above the main cluster in the rightmost image.

Melnick 42 is a massive blue supergiant star in the Tarantula Nebula in the Large Magellanic Cloud located in the constellation Dorado. Although it is only 21 times the size of the sun, its high temperature of 47,300 K makes it one of the most massive and most luminous stars of the Tarantula Nebula at 3,600,000 L_{☉}. It is less than two parsecs from the centre of the R136 cluster, although that is well outside the central core.

Mk 42 was originally classified as spectral type WN when it was discovered, then as O3 If. When the slash stars were defined it was given the spectral type O3 If^{*}/WN6. Finally, the introduction of the spectral class O2 and the refinement of slash star classifications led to it being tagged as O2 If^{*}. Although it is given a supergiant luminosity class, it is effectively a main sequence star still burning hydrogen in its core. It is thought to be less than a million years old.

== See also ==
- List of most massive stars
