= WR 22 =

Binary star in the constellation Carina

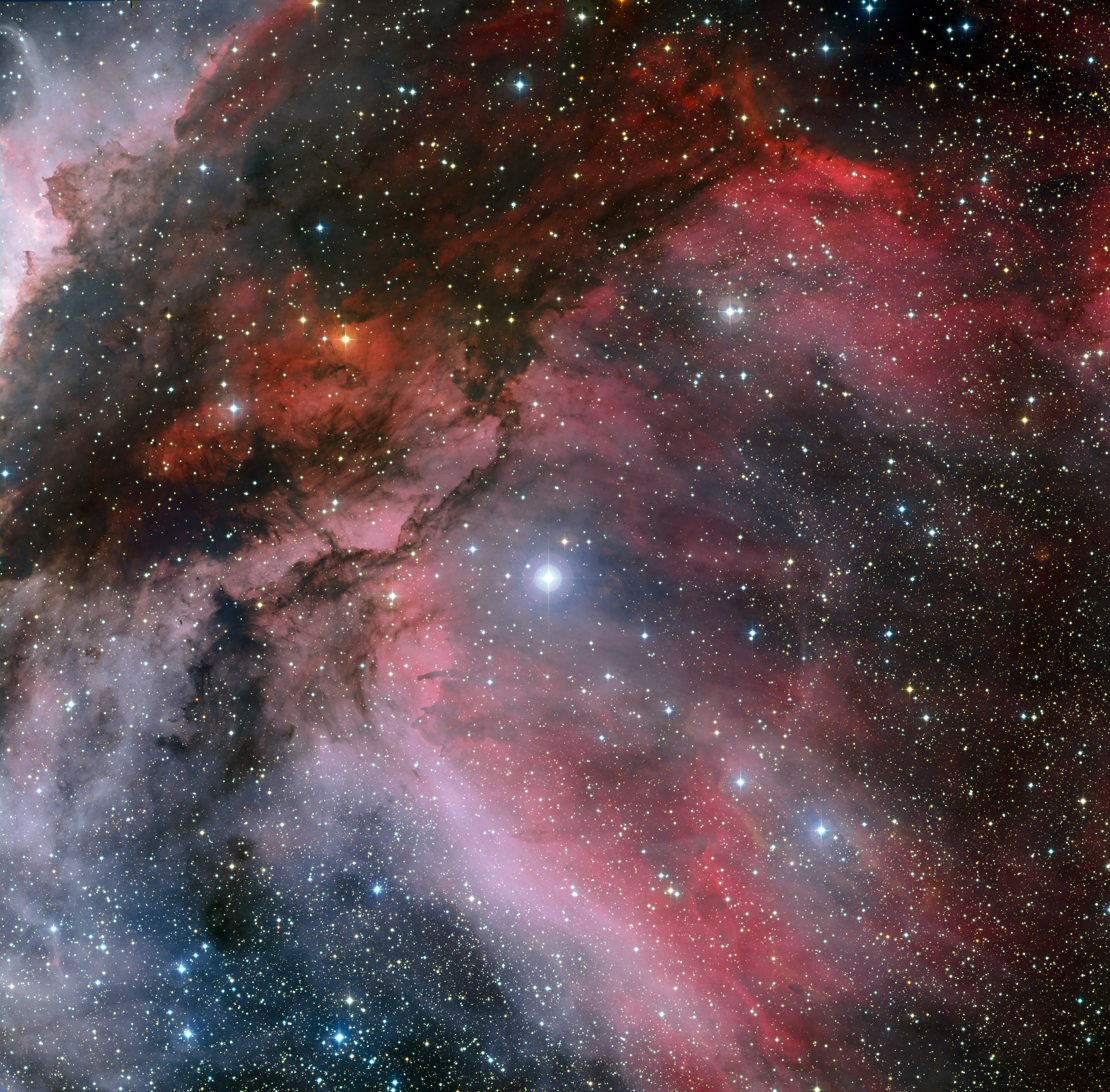
- WR 22 (center) in the Carina nebula

Observation data Epoch J2000.0 Equinox J2000.0
- Constellation: Carina
- Right ascension: 10^{h} 41^{m} 17.51590^{s}
- Declination: −59° 40′ 36.8957″
- Apparent magnitude (V): 6.42

Characteristics
- Spectral type: WN7h + O9III-V
- Apparent magnitude (U): 5.68
- Apparent magnitude (B): 6.50
- Apparent magnitude (J): 5.705
- Apparent magnitude (H): 5.578
- Apparent magnitude (K): 5.389
- U−B color index: −0.82
- B−V color index: 0.08
- J−H color index: 0.127
- J−K color index: 0.316
- Variable type: Eclipsing binary

Astrometry
Radial velocity (R_{v})	−28.00 km/s
Proper motion (μ)	RA: −7.321 mas/yr Dec.: 3.091 mas/yr
Parallax (π)	0.3953±0.0348 mas
Distance	8,300 ± 700 ly (2,500 ± 200 pc)
Absolute magnitude (M_{V})	−6.73 + −4.44

Orbit
Primary	WR
Name	O
Period (P)	80.336 days
Semi-major axis (a)	330 R_{☉}
Eccentricity (e)	0.598
Inclination (i)	83.5°
Argument of periastron (ω) (secondary)	268.2°
Semi-amplitude (K_{1}) (primary)	70.6 km/s
Semi-amplitude (K_{2}) (secondary)	190.0 km/s

Details

WR
Mass	56.38 M_{☉}
Radius	22.65 R_{☉}
Luminosity	1,905,000 L_{☉}
Temperature	50,000 K

O
Mass	21.00 M_{☉}
Radius	11 R_{☉}
Luminosity	130,000 L_{☉}
Temperature	33,000 K
Age	2.2 Myr

Other designations
- CD−59°3221, HR 4188, HD 92740, V429 Carinae, HIP 52308

Database references
SIMBAD	data

WR 22, also known as V429 Carinae or HR 4188, is an eclipsing binary star system in the constellation Carina. The system contains a Wolf-Rayet (WR) star that is one of the most massive and most luminous stars known, and is also a bright X-ray source due to colliding winds with a less massive O class companion. Its eclipsing nature and apparent magnitude make it very useful for constraining the properties of luminous hydrogen-rich WR stars.

In 1978, Anthony Moffat and Wilhelm Seggewiss announced that the star's brightness varies. Eclipses were first detected by Luis A. Balona et al. in 1989. It received its variable star designation, V429 Carinae, in 1980.

== System ==
The WR 22 system contains two massive stars which orbit every 80 days. The spectrum and luminosity are dominated by the primary, which has a spectral type of WN7h, indicating that it is a WR star on the nitrogen sequence, but also with hydrogen lines in its spectrum. The secondary is an O9 star which appears to have the spectral luminosity class of a giant star, but the brightness of a main sequence star.

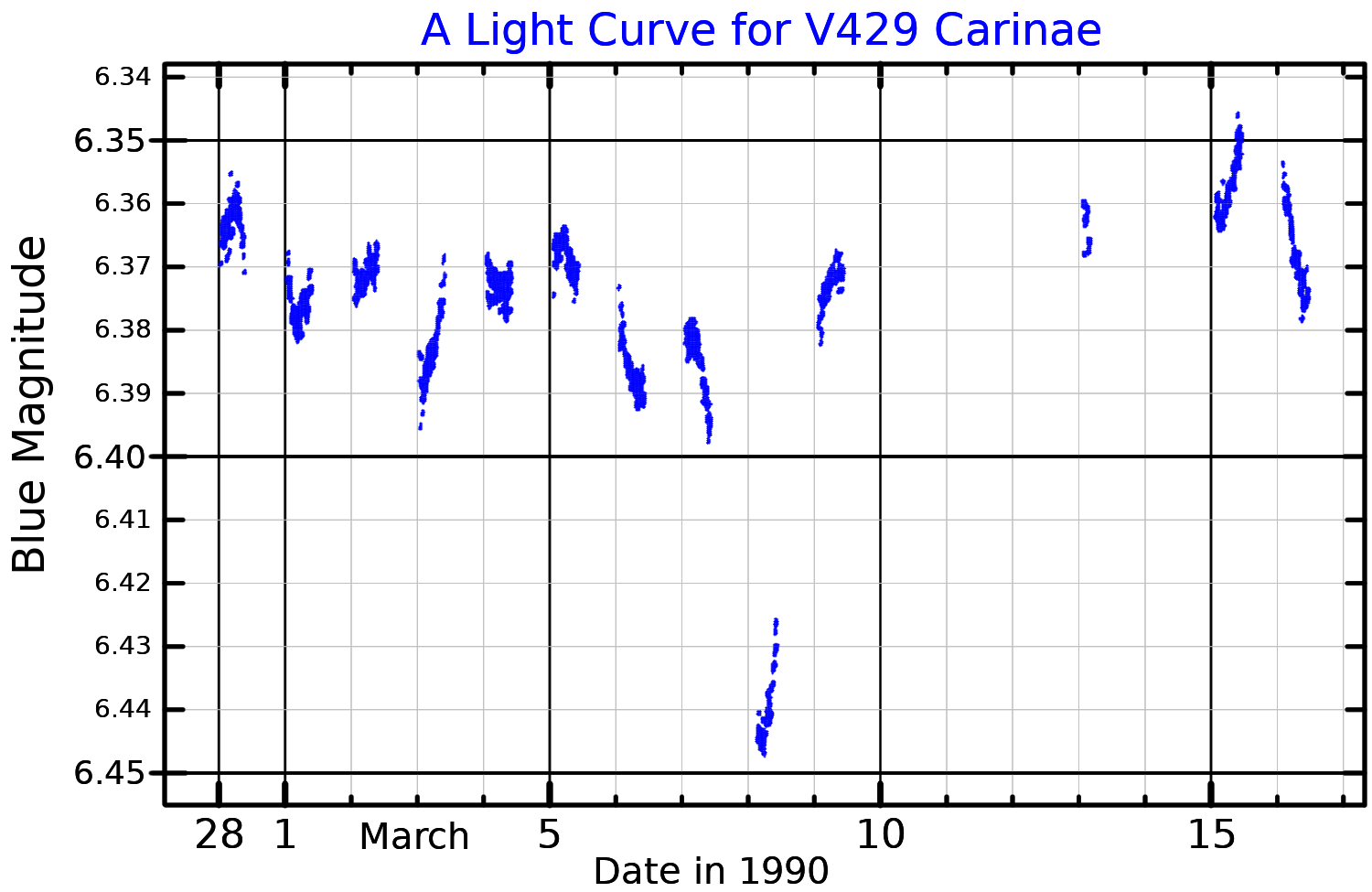
A blue band light curve for V429 Carinae, showing an eclipse minimum at UT 02:24 on March 8, 1990. Adapted from Gosset et al. (1991)

There is a shallow eclipse detectable when the primary passes in front of the secondary, which would be classed as the secondary eclipse. However, no primary eclipse is detected, which is believed to be due to the eccentricity of the system placing the stars further apart when the primary eclipse would occur. The separation of the stars varies from over 500 R_{☉} to less than 150 R_{☉}. This strongly constrains the possible inclinations of the system.

== Properties ==
The masses of the two stars can be determined fairly accurately because WR 22 is an eclipsing binary. It is one of the most massive star systems measured in this way rather than by assumptions about stellar evolution. Despite this, the dynamical masses derived from orbital fitting vary from over 70 M_{☉} to less than 60 M_{☉} for the primary and about 21 - 27 M_{☉} for the secondary. The spectroscopic mass of the primary has been calculated at 74 M_{☉} or 78.1 M_{☉}.

The temperature of both stars is high, but somewhat poorly defined. The Wolf Rayet primary has a temperature of approximately 44,700 K derived from a model atmosphere fitting of the spectrum, and the secondary is assumed to have a temperature of 33,000 K which is typical for a star of its spectral type.

The brightness of the two stars cannot be measured separately, but the luminosity ratio can be calculated. The total system absolute magnitude, for a distance of 2.7 kpc and extinction of 1.12 magnitudes, is −6.85. The luminosities calculated for a similar distance are two million L_{☉} and 130,000 L_{☉}.

== Evolution ==
High mass hydrogen-rich WR stars are young stars still burning hydrogen in their cores, rather than evolved stars fusing heavier elements. They show the WR characteristics of strong helium and nitrogen emission because they are strongly convective all the way to the core and have dredged up fusion products to the surface. About two million years ago, WR22 would have been an even hotter O type main sequence star with a mass of around 120 M_{☉}. It will soon exhaust the hydrogen in its core and evolve into a classical hydrogen-poor WR star, possibly after a period as a luminous blue variable, then explode as a supernova. The secondary star is expected to have a more traditional evolution into a red hypergiant in a few million years time.
