= Wolf–Rayet star =

Heterogeneous class of stars with unusual spectra

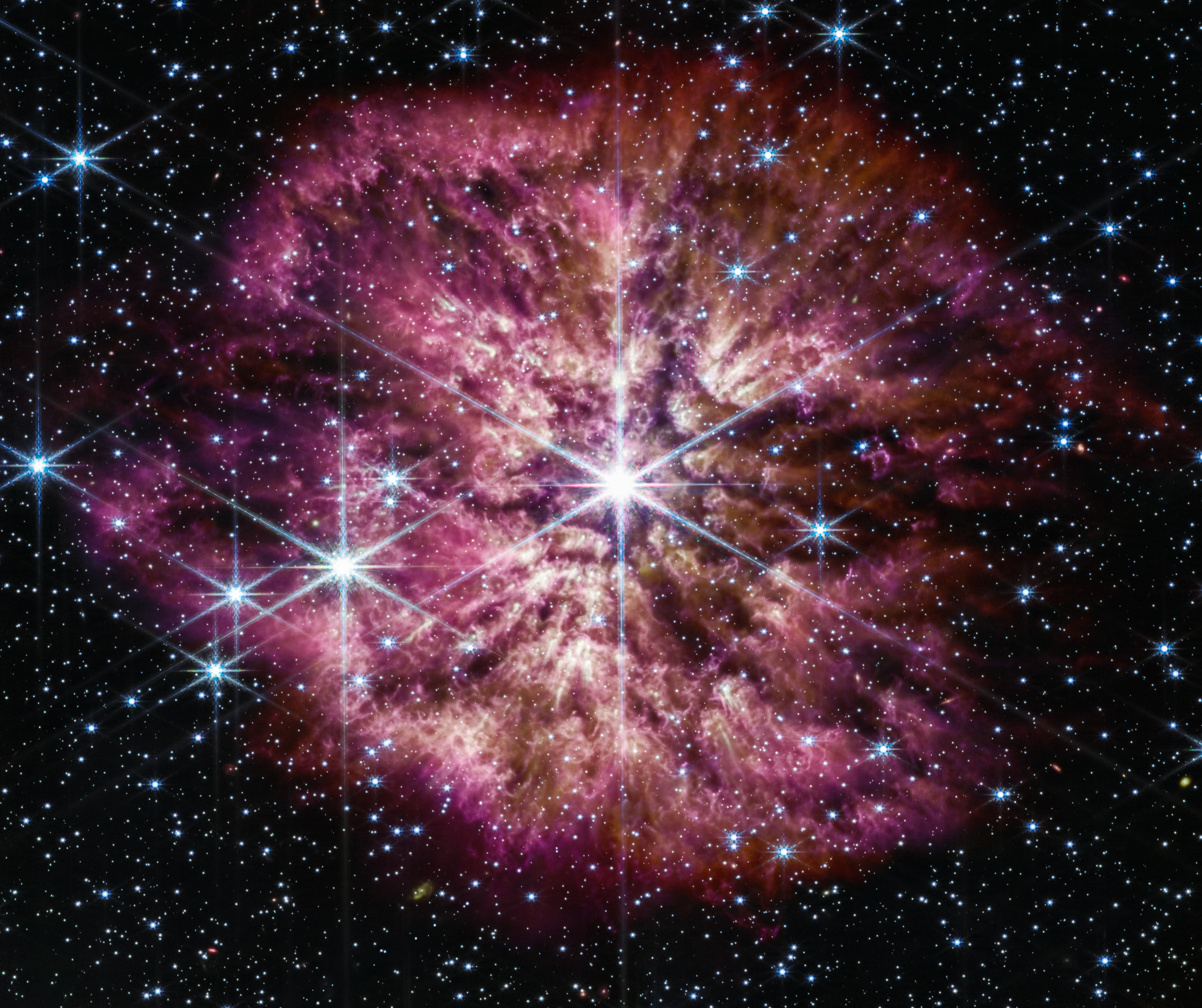
James Webb Space Telescope image of the Wolf–Rayet star WR 124 and the nebula M1–67 surrounding it (NIRCam and MIRI composite)

Wolf–Rayet stars, often abbreviated as WR stars, are a rare heterogeneous set of stars with unusual spectra showing prominent broad emission lines of ionised helium and highly ionised nitrogen or carbon. The spectra indicate very high surface enhancement of heavy elements, depletion of hydrogen, and strong stellar winds. The surface temperatures of known Wolf–Rayet stars range from 20,000 K to around 210,000 K, hotter than almost all other kinds of stars. They were previously called W-type stars referring to their spectral classification.

Classic (or population I) Wolf–Rayet stars are evolved, massive stars that have completely lost their outer hydrogen and are fusing helium or heavier elements in the core. A subset of the population I WR stars show hydrogen lines in their spectra and are known as WNh stars; they are young extremely massive stars still fusing hydrogen at the core, with helium and nitrogen exposed at the surface by strong mixing and radiation-driven mass loss. A separate group of stars with WR spectra are the central stars of planetary nebulae (CSPNe), post-asymptotic giant branch stars that were similar to the Sun while on the main sequence, but have now ceased fusion and shed their atmospheres to reveal a bare carbon-oxygen core.

All Wolf–Rayet stars are highly luminous objects due to their high temperatures—thousands of times the bolometric luminosity of the Sun (L_{☉}) for the CSPNe, hundreds of thousands L_{☉} for the population I WR stars, to over a million L_{☉} for the WNh stars—although not exceptionally bright visually since most of their radiation output is in the ultraviolet.

The naked-eye star systems γ Velorum and θ Muscae both contain Wolf-Rayet stars, and two of the most massive known stars, BAT99-98 and R136a1 in 30 Doradus, are also Wolf–Rayet stars.

== Observation history ==
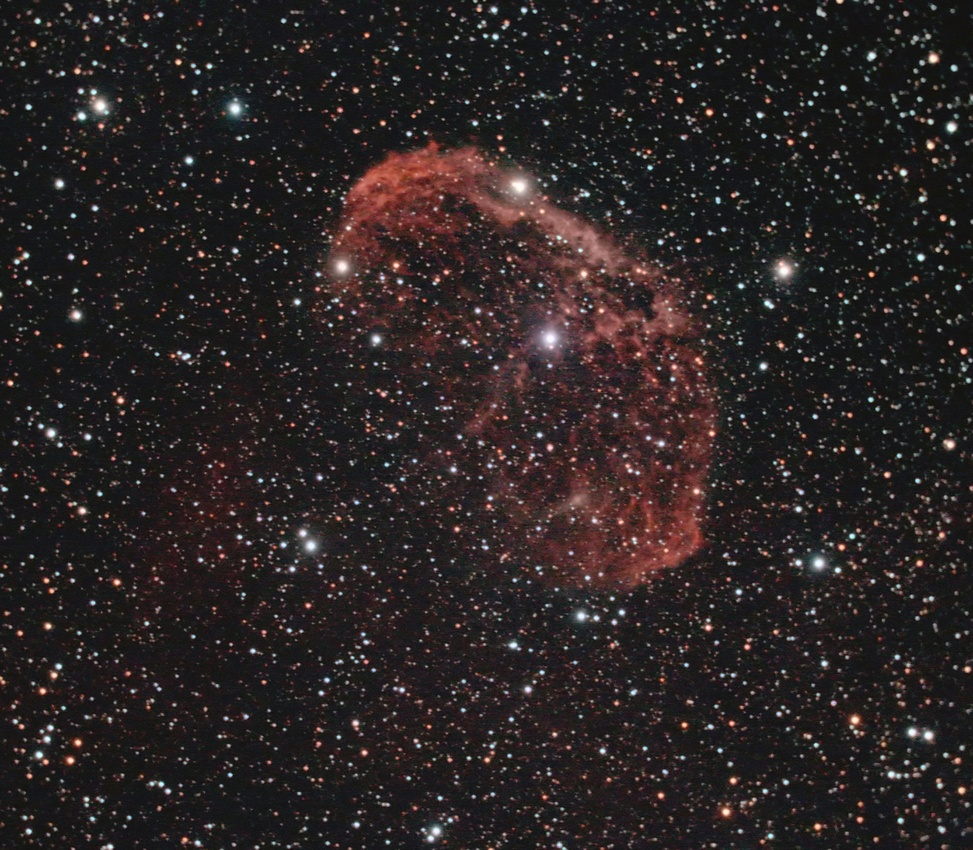
WR 136, a WN6 star where the atmosphere shed during the red supergiant phase has been shocked by the hot, fast WR winds to form a visible bubble nebula

In 1867, using the 40 cm Foucault telescope at the Paris Observatory, astronomers Charles Wolf and Georges Rayet discovered three stars in the constellation Cygnus (HD 191765, HD 192103 and HD 192641, now designated as WR 134, WR 135, and WR 137 respectively) that displayed broad emission bands on an otherwise continuous spectrum. Most stars only display absorption lines or bands in their spectra, as a result of overlying elements absorbing light energy at specific frequencies, so these were clearly unusual objects.

The nature of the emission bands in the spectra of a Wolf–Rayet star remained a mystery for several decades. E.C. Pickering theorized that the lines were caused by an unusual state of hydrogen, and it was found that this "Pickering series" of lines followed a pattern similar to the Balmer series when half-integer quantum numbers were substituted. It was later shown that these lines resulted from the presence of helium, the chemical element having just been discovered in 1868. (The transition energies for an electron falling to the n=4 state around a nucleus of charge +2 are quite close to those of an electron falling to the n=2 state around a nucleus of charge +1, but with extra lines for electrons falling from states with odd values of n, whose energies correspond to transitions from a fictional n/2 state in hydrogen.) Pickering noted similarities between Wolf–Rayet spectra and nebular spectra, and this similarity led to the conclusion that some or all Wolf–Rayet stars were the central stars of planetary nebulae.

By 1929, the width of the emission bands was being attributed to Doppler broadening, and hence the gas surrounding these stars must be moving with velocities of 300–2400 km/s along the line of sight. The conclusion was that a Wolf–Rayet star is continually ejecting gas into space, producing an expanding envelope of nebulous gas. The force ejecting the gas at the high velocities observed is radiation pressure. It was well known that many stars with Wolf–Rayet type spectra were the central stars of planetary nebulae, but also that many were not associated with an obvious planetary nebula or any visible nebulosity at all.

In addition to helium, Carlyle Smith Beals identified emission lines of carbon, oxygen and nitrogen in the spectra of Wolf–Rayet stars. In 1938, the International Astronomical Union classified the spectra of Wolf–Rayet stars into types WN and WC, depending on whether the spectrum was dominated by lines of nitrogen or carbon-oxygen respectively.

In 1969, several CSPNe with strong oxygen VI (O VI) emissions lines were grouped under a new "O VI sequence", or just OVI type. Similar stars not associated with planetary nebulae were described shortly after and the WO classification was adopted for them. The OVI stars were subsequently classified as [WO] stars, consistent with the population I WR stars.

The understanding that certain late, and sometimes not-so-late, WN stars with hydrogen lines in their spectra are at a different stage of evolution from hydrogen-free WR stars has led to the introduction of the term WNh to distinguish these stars generally from other WN stars. They were previously referred to as WNL stars, although there are late-type WN stars without hydrogen as well as WR stars with hydrogen as early as WN5.

== Classification ==
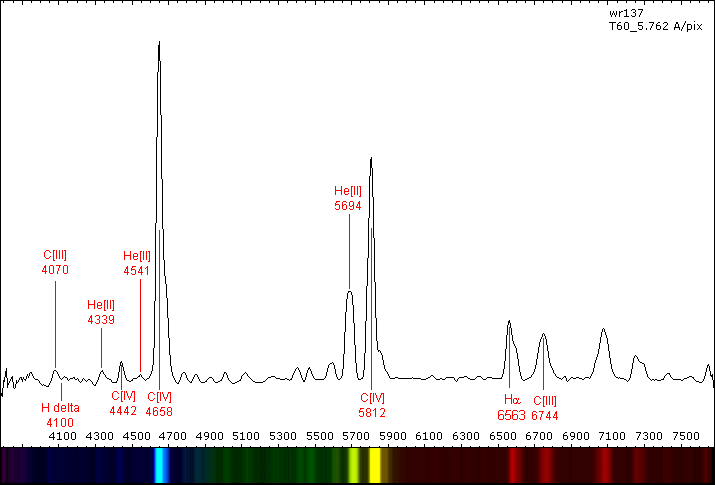
Spectrum of WR 137, a WC7 star and one of the three original WR stars (horizontal axis: wavelength in Å - the peak at 5694 is mis-labelled and should be C III, a key line for classifying WC stars.)

Wolf–Rayet stars were named on the basis of the strong broad emission lines in their spectra, identified with helium, nitrogen, carbon, silicon, and oxygen, but with hydrogen lines usually weak or absent. Initially simply referred to as class W or W-type stars, the classification was then split into stars with dominant lines of ionised nitrogen (N III, N IV, and N V) and those with dominant lines of ionised carbon (C III and C IV) and sometimes oxygen (O III – O VI), referred to as WN and WC respectively. The two classes WN and WC were further split into temperature sequences WN5–WN8 and WC6–WC8 based on the relative strengths of the 541.1 nm He II and 587.5 nm He I lines. Wolf–Rayet emission lines frequently have a broadened absorption wing (P Cygni profile) suggesting circumstellar material. A WO sequence has also been separated from the WC sequence for even hotter stars where emission of ionised oxygen dominates that of ionised carbon, although the actual proportions of those elements in the stars are likely to be comparable. WC and WO spectra are formally distinguished based on the presence or absence of C III emission. WC spectra also generally lack the O VI lines that are strong in WO spectra.

The WN spectral sequence was expanded to include WN2–WN9, and the definitions refined based on the relative strengths of the N III lines at 463.4–464.1 nm and 531.4 nm, the N IV lines at 347.9–348.4 nm and 405.8 nm, and the N V lines at 460.3 nm, 461.9 nm, and 493.3–494.4 nm. These lines are well separated from areas of strong and variable He emission and the line strengths are well correlated with temperature. Stars with spectra intermediate between WN and Ofpe have been classified as WN10 and WN11 although this nomenclature is not universally accepted.

The type WN1 was proposed for stars with neither N IV nor N V lines, to accommodate Brey 1 and Brey 66 which appeared to be intermediate between WN2 and WN2.5. The relative line strengths and widths for each WN sub-class were later quantified, and the ratio between the 541.1 nm He II and 587.5 nm, He I lines was introduced as the primary indicator of the ionisation level and hence of the spectral sub-class. The need for WN1 disappeared and both Brey 1 and Brey 66 are now classified as WN3b. The somewhat obscure WN2.5 and WN4.5 classes were dropped.

Classification of WN spectra
Spectral Type	Original criteria	Updated criteria	Other features
WN2	N V weak or absent	N V and N IV absent	Strong He II, no He I
WN2.5	N V present, N IV absent	Obsolete class	
WN3	N IV ≪ N V, N III weak or absent	He II/He I > 10, He II/C IV > 5	Peculiar profiles, unpredictable N V strength
WN4	N IV ≈ N V, N III weak or absent	4 < He II/He I < 10, N V/N III > 2	C IV present
WN4.5	N IV > N V, N III weak or absent	Obsolete class	
WN5	N III ≈ N IV ≈ N V	1.25 < He II/He I < 8, 0.5 < N V/N III < 2	N IV or C IV > He I
WN6	N III ≈ N IV, N V weak	1.25 < He II/He I < 8, 0.2 < N V/N III < 0.5	C IV ≈ He I
WN7	N III > N IV	0.65 < He II/He I < 1.25	Weak P-Cyg profile He I, He II > N III, C IV > He I
WN8	N III ≫ N IV	He II/He I < 0.65	Strong P-Cyg profile He I, He II ≈ N III, C IV weak
WN9	N III > N II, N IV absent	N III > N II, N IV absent	P-Cyg profile He I
WN10	N III ≈ N II	N III ≈ N II	H Balmer, P-Cyg profile He I
WN11	N III weak or absent, N II present	N II ≈ He II, N III weak or absent,	H Balmer, P-Cyg profile He I, Fe III present

The WC spectral sequence was expanded to include WC4–WC11, although some older papers have also used WC1–WC3. The primary emission lines used to distinguish the WC sub-types are C II 426.7 nm, C III at 569.6 nm, C III/IV 465.0 nm, C IV at 580.1–581.2 nm, and the O V (and O III) blend at 557.2–559.8 nm. The sequence was extended to include WC10 and WC11, and the subclass criteria were quantified based primarily on the relative strengths of carbon lines to rely on ionisation factors even if there were abundance variations between carbon and oxygen.

Classification of WC spectra
Spectral type	Original criteria	Quantitative criteria		Other features
Spectral type	Original criteria	Primary	Secondary	Other features
WC4	C IV strong, C II weak, O V moderate	C IV/C III > 32	O V/C III > 2.5	O VI weak or absent
WC5	C III ≪ C IV, C III < O V	12.5 < C IV/C III < 32	0.4 < C III/O V < 3	O VI weak or absent
WC6	C III ≪ C IV, C III > O V	4 < C IV/C III < 12.5	1 < C III/O V < 5	O VI weak or absent
WC7	C III < C IV, C III ≫ O V	1.25 < C IV/C III < 4	C III/O V > 1.25	O VI weak or absent
WC8	C III > C IV, C II absent, O V weak or absent	0.5 < C IV/C III < 1.25	C IV/C II > 10	He II/He I > 1.25
WC9	C III > C IV, C II present, O V weak or absent	0.2 < C IV/C III < 0.5	0.6 < C IV/C II < 10	0.15 < He II/He I < 1.25
WC10		0.06 < C IV/C III < 0.15	0.03 < C IV/C II < 0.6	He II/He I < 0.15
WC11		C IV/C III < 0.06	C IV/C II < 0.03	He II absent

For WO-type stars the main lines used are C IV at 580.1 nm, O IV at 340.0 nm, O V (and O III) blend at 557.2–559.8 nm, O VI at 381.1–383.4 nm, O VII at 567.0 nm, and O VIII at 606.8 nm. The sequence was expanded to include WO5 and quantified based the relative strengths of the O VI/C IV and O VI/O V lines. A later scheme, designed for consistency across classical WR stars and CSPNe, returned to the WO1 to WO4 sequence and adjusted the divisions.

Classification of WO spectra
Spectral type	Original criteria	Quantitative criteria		Other features
Spectral type	Original criteria	Primary	Secondary	Other features
WO1	O VII ≥ O V, O VIII present	O VI/O V > 12.5	O VI/C IV > 1.5	O VII ≥ O V
WO2	O VII < O V, C IV < O VI	4 < O VI/O V < 12.5	O VI/C IV > 1.5	O VII ≤ O V
WO3	O VII weak or absent, C IV ≈ O VI	1.8 < O VI/O V < 4	0.1 < O VI/C IV < 1.5	O VII ≪ O V
WO4	C IV ≫ O VI	0.5 < O VI/O V < 1.8	0.03 < O VI/C IV < 0.1	O VII ≪ O V

Detailed modern studies of Wolf–Rayet stars can identify additional spectral features, indicated by suffixes to the main spectral classification:

- h for hydrogen emission;
- ha for hydrogen emission and absorption;
- o for no hydrogen emission;
- w for weak lines;
- s for strong lines;
- b for broad strong lines;
- d for dust (occasionally vd, pd, or ed for variable, periodic, or episodic dust).

The classification of Wolf–Rayet spectra is complicated by the frequent association of the stars with dense nebulosity, dust clouds, or binary companions. A suffix of "+OB" is used to indicate the presence of absorption lines in the spectrum likely to be associated with a more normal companion star, or "+abs" for absorption lines with an unknown origin.

The hotter WR spectral sub-classes are described as early and the cooler ones as late, consistent with other spectral types. WNE and WCE refer to early type spectra while WNL and WCL refer to late type spectra, with the dividing line approximately at sub-class six or seven. There is no such thing as a late WO-type star. There is a strong tendency for WNE stars to be hydrogen-poor while the spectra of WNL stars frequently include hydrogen lines.

Spectral types for the central stars of planetary nebulae are qualified by surrounding them with square brackets (e.g. [WC4]). They are almost all of the WC sequence with the known [WO] stars representing the hot extension of the carbon sequence. There are also a small number of [WN] and [WC/WN] types, only discovered quite recently. Their formation mechanism is as yet unclear. Temperatures of the planetary nebula central stars tend to the extremes when compared to population I WR stars, so [WC2] and [WC3] are common and the sequence has been extended to [WC12]. The [WC11] and [WC12] types have distinctive spectra with narrow emission lines and no He II and C IV lines.

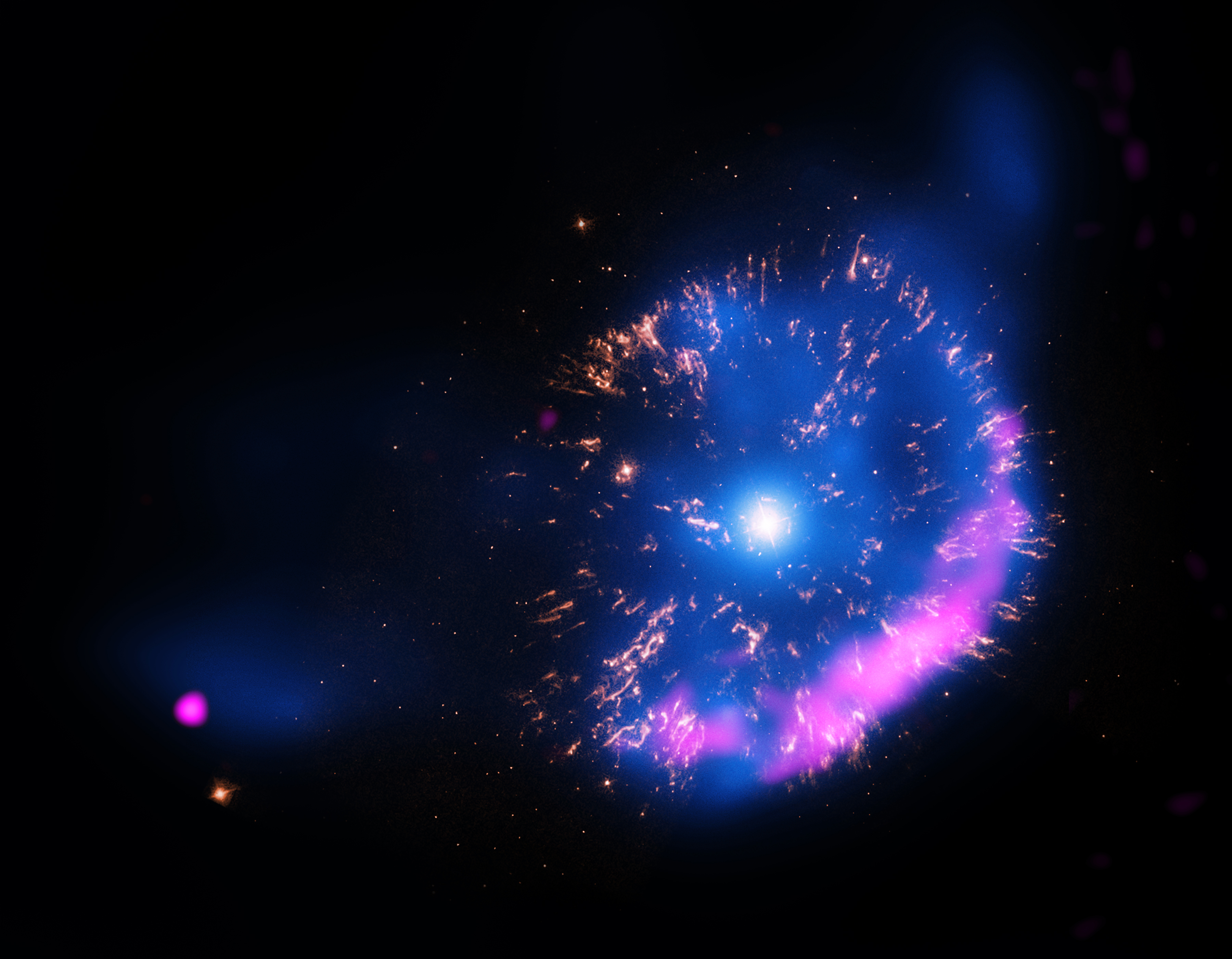
GK Persei (Nova Persei 1901), which showed Wolf–Rayet features in its spectrum

Certain supernovae observed before their peak brightness show WR spectra. This is due to the nature of the supernova at this point: a rapidly expanding helium-rich ejecta similar to an extreme Wolf–Rayet wind. The WR spectral features only last a matter of hours, the high ionisation features fading by maximum to leave only weak neutral hydrogen and helium emission, before being replaced with a traditional supernova spectrum. It has been proposed to label these spectral types with an "X", for example XWN5(h). Similarly, classical novae develop spectra consisting of broad emission bands similar to a Wolf–Rayet star. This is caused by the same physical mechanism: rapid expansion of dense gases around an extremely hot central source.

== Slash stars ==
The separation of Wolf–Rayet stars from spectral class O stars of a similar temperature depends on the existence of strong emission lines of ionised helium, nitrogen, carbon, and oxygen, but there are a number of stars with intermediate or confusing spectral features. For example, high-luminosity O stars can develop helium and nitrogen in their spectra with some emission lines, while some WR stars have hydrogen lines, weak emission, and even absorption components. These stars have been given spectral types such as O3If^{∗}/WN6 and are referred to as slash stars.

Class O supergiants can develop emission lines of helium and nitrogen, or emission components to some absorption lines. These are indicated by spectral peculiarity suffix codes specific to this type of star:

- f for N iii and He ii emission
- f^{*} for N and He emission with N iv stronger than N iii
- f^{+} for emission in Si iv in addition to N and He
- parentheses indicating He ii absorption lines instead of emission, e.g. (f)
- double parentheses indicating strong He ii absorption and N iii emission diluted, e.g. ((f^{+}))

These codes may also be combined with more general spectral type qualifiers such as p or a. Common combinations include OIafpe and OIf^{*}, and Ofpe. In the 1970s, it was recognised that there was a continuum of spectra from pure absorption class O to unambiguous WR types, and it was unclear whether some intermediate stars should be given a spectral type such as O8Iafpe or WN8-a. The slash notation was proposed to deal with these situations, and the star Sk−67°22 was assigned the spectral type O3If^{*}/WN6-A. The criteria for distinguishing OIf^{*}, OIf^{*}/WN, and WN stars have been refined for consistency. Slash star classifications are used when the H_{β} line has a P Cygni profile; this is an absorption line in O supergiants and an emission line in WN stars. Criteria for the following slash star spectral types are given, using the nitrogen emission lines at 463.4–464.1 nm, 405.8 nm, and 460.3–462.0 nm, together with a standard star for each type:

Classification of slash stars
Spectral type	Standard star	Criteria
O2If^{*}/WN5	Melnick 35	N iv ≫ N iii, N v ≥ N iii
O2.5If^{*}/WN6	WR 25	N iv > N iii, N v < N iii
O3.5If^{*}/WN7	Melnick 51	N iv < N iii, N v ≪ N iii

Another set of slash star spectral types is in use for Ofpe/WN stars. These stars have O supergiant spectra plus nitrogen and helium emission, and P Cygni profiles. Alternatively they can be considered to be WN stars with unusually low ionisation levels and hydrogen. The slash notation for these stars was controversial and an alternative was to extend the WR nitrogen sequence to WN10 and WN11 Other authors preferred to use the WNha notation, for example WN9ha for WR 108. A recent recommendation is to use an O spectral type such as O8Iaf if the 447.1 nm He i line is in absorption and a WR class of WN9h or WN9ha if the line has a P Cygni profile. However, the Ofpe/WN slash notation as well as WN10 and WN11 classifications continue to be widely used.

A third group of stars with spectra containing features of both O class stars and WR stars has been identified. Nine stars in the Large Magellanic Cloud have spectra that contain both WN3 and O3V features, but do not appear to be binaries. Many of the WR stars in the Small Magellanic Cloud also have very early WN spectra plus high excitation absorption features. It has been suggested that these could be a missing link leading to classical WN stars or the result of tidal stripping by a low-mass companion.

== Nomenclature ==
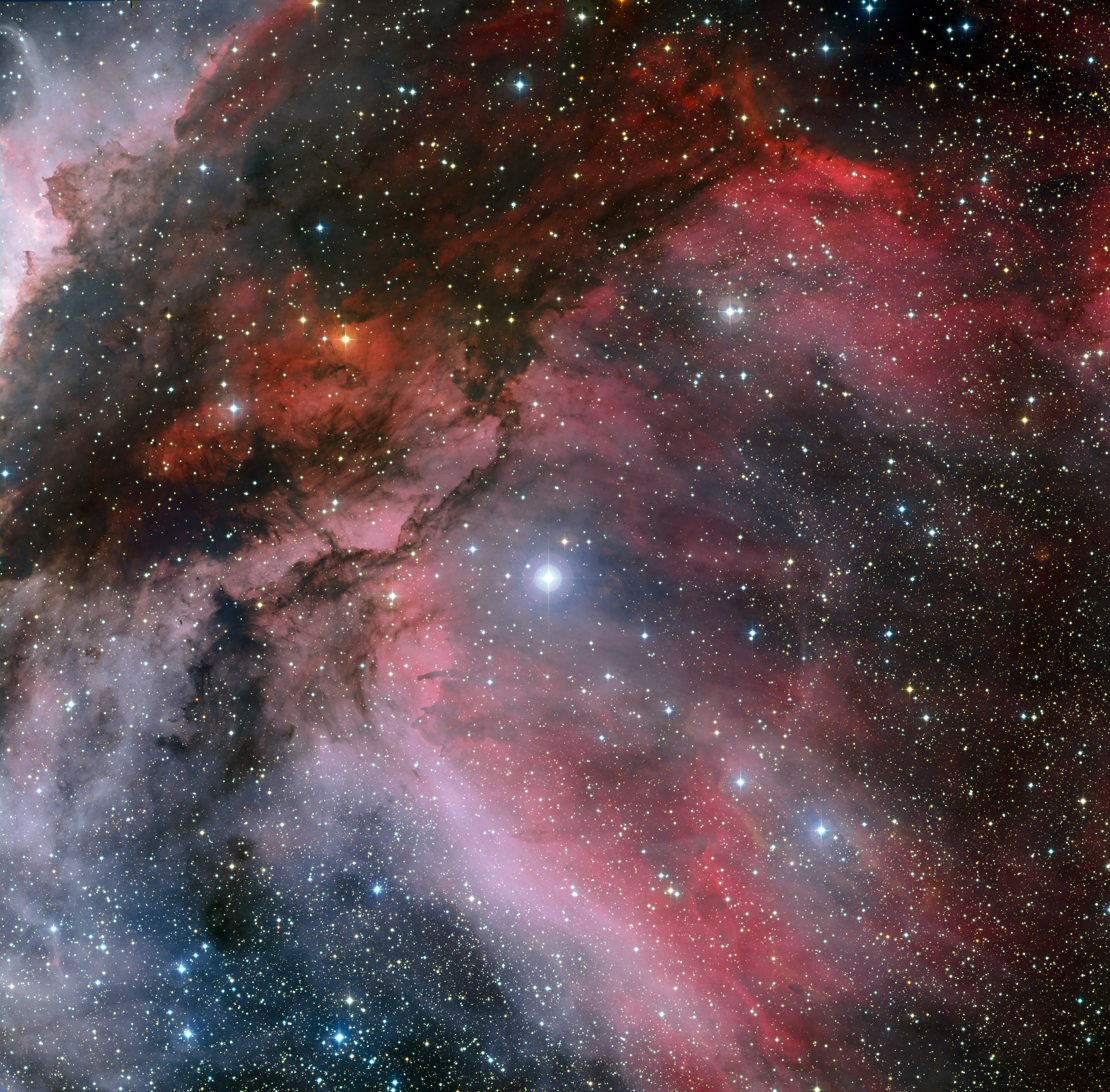
WR 22 in the Carina Nebula

The first three Wolf–Rayet stars to be identified, coincidentally all with hot O-class companions, had already been numbered in the Henry Draper catalogue. These stars and others were referred to as Wolf–Rayet stars from their initial discovery but specific naming conventions for them would not be created until 1962 in the "fourth" catalogue of galactic Wolf–Rayet stars. The first three catalogues were not specifically lists of Wolf–Rayet stars and they used only existing nomenclature.

The fourth catalogue of Wolf–Rayet stars numbered them sequentially in order of right ascension. The fifth catalogue used the same numbers prefixed with MR after the author of the fourth catalogue, plus an additional sequence of numbers prefixed with LS for new discoveries. Neither of these numbering schemes remains in common use.

=== Modern WR catalogues ===
The sixth Catalogue of Galactic Wolf–Rayet stars was the first to actually bear that name, as well as to describe the previous five catalogues by that name. It also introduced the WR numbers widely used ever since for galactic WR stars. These are again a numerical sequence from WR 1 to WR 158 in order of right ascension.

Compiled in 2001, the seventh catalogue and its annex used the same numbering scheme and inserted new stars into the sequence using lower case letter suffixes, for example WR 102ka for one of the numerous WR stars discovered in the galactic centre. Modern high volume identification surveys use their own numbering schemes for the large numbers of new discoveries. A 2006 Annex was added to the seventh catalog.

In 2011, an online Galactic Wolf Rayet Catalogue was set up, hosted by the University of Sheffield. As of February 2025, it includes 709 stars.

=== Other numbering schemes ===
Wolf–Rayet stars in external galaxies are numbered using different schemes. In the Large Magellanic Cloud, the most widespread and complete nomenclature for WR stars is from "The Fourth Catalogue of Population I Wolf–Rayet stars in the Large Magellanic Cloud" prefixed by BAT-99, for example BAT-99 105. Many of these stars are also referred to by their third catalogue number, for example Brey 77. As of 2018, 154 WR stars are catalogued in the LMC, mostly WN but including about twenty-three WCs as well as three of the extremely rare WO class. Many of these stars are often referred to by their RMC (Radcliffe observatory Magellanic Cloud) numbers, frequently abbreviated to just R, for example R136a1.

In the Small Magellanic Cloud SMC WR numbers are used, usually referred to as AB numbers, for example AB7. There are only twelve known WR stars in the SMC, a very low number thought to be due to the low metallicity of that galaxy.

In 2012, an IAU working group expanded the numbering system from the Catalogue of Galactic Wolf–Rayet stars so that additional discoveries are given the closest existing WR number plus a numeric suffix in order of discovery. This applies to all discoveries since the 2006 annex, although some of these have already been named under the previous nomenclature; thus WR 42e is now numbered WR 42-1.

== Properties ==
Wolf–Rayet stars are a normal stage in the evolution of very massive stars, in which strong, broad emission lines of helium and nitrogen ("WN" sequence), carbon ("WC" sequence), and oxygen ("WO" sequence) are visible. Due to their strong emission lines they can be identified in nearby galaxies. About 600 Wolf–Rayets have been catalogued in our own Milky Way Galaxy. This number has changed dramatically during the last few years as the result of photometric and spectroscopic surveys in the near-infrared dedicated to discovering this kind of object in the Galactic plane. It is expected that there are fewer than 1,000 WR stars in the rest of the Local Group galaxies, with around 166 known in the Magellanic Clouds, 206 in the Triangulum Galaxy, and 154 in the Andromeda Galaxy.

Outside the local group, whole galaxy surveys have found thousands more WR stars and candidates. For example, in the M101 Group, over a thousand potential WR stars have been detected, from magnitude 21 to 25, and astronomers hope to eventually catalog over ten thousand. These stars are expected to be particularly common in the Wolf–Rayet galaxies named after them and in starburst galaxies.

Their characteristic emission lines are formed in the extended and dense high-velocity wind region enveloping the very hot stellar photosphere, which produces a flood of UV radiation that causes fluorescence in the line-forming wind region. This ejection process uncovers in succession, first the nitrogen-rich products of CNO cycle burning of hydrogen (WN stars), and later the carbon-rich layer due to He burning (WC and WO-type stars).

Physical properties of galactic population I WN stars
Spectral type	Temperature (K)	Radius (R_{☉})	Mass (M_{☉})	Luminosity (L_{☉})	Absolute magnitude	Example
WN2	141,000	0.89	16	280,000	−2.6	WR 2
WN3	85,000	2.3	19	220,000	−3.2	WR 46
WN4	70,000	2.3	15	200,000	−3.8	WR 1
WN5	60,000	3.7	15	160,000	−4.4	WR 149
WN5h	50,000	20	200	5,000,000	−8.0	R136a1
WN6	56,000	5.7	18	160,000	−5.1	CD Crucis
WN6h	45,000	25	74	3,300,000	−7.5	NGC 3603-A1
WN7	50,000	6.0	21	350,000	−5.7	WR 120
WN7h	45,000	23	52	2,000,000	−7.2	WR 22
WN8	45,000	6.6	11	160,000	−5.5	WR 123
WN8h	40,000	22	39	1,300,000	−7.2	WR 124
WN9h	35,000	23	33	940,000	−7.1	WR 102ea

It can be seen that the WNh stars are completely different objects from the WN stars without hydrogen. Despite the similar spectra, they are much more massive, much larger, and some of the most luminous stars known. They have been detected as early as WN5h in the Magellanic Clouds. The nitrogen seen in the spectrum of WNh stars is still the product of CNO cycle fusion in the core, but it appears at the surface of the most massive stars due to rotational and convectional mixing while still in the core hydrogen burning phase, rather than after the outer envelope is lost during core helium fusion.

Physical properties of galactic population I WO/C stars
Spectral type	Temperature (K)	Radius (R_{☉})	Mass (M_{☉})	Luminosity (L_{☉})	Absolute magnitude	Example
WO2	200,000	0.7	22	630,000	−1.7	WR 142
WC4	117,000	0.9	10	158,000	−3.28	WR 143
WC5	83,000	3.2	18	398,000	−4.87	Theta Muscae
WC6	78,000	3.6	18	501,000	−4.75	WR 45
WC7	71,000	4.0	17	398,000	−4.8	WR 86
WC8	60,000	6.3	18	398,000	−5.32	Gamma Velorum
WC9	44,000	8.7	13	251,000	−5.57	WR 104

Some Wolf–Rayet stars of the carbon sequence ("WC"), especially those belonging to the latest types, are noticeable due to their production of dust. Usually this takes place on those belonging to binary systems as a product of the collision of the stellar winds forming the pair, as is the case of the famous binary WR 104; however this process occurs on single ones too.

A few—roughly 10%—of the central stars of planetary nebulae, despite their much lower masses—typically ~0.6 M_{☉}—are also observationally of the WR-type; i.e. they show emission line spectra with broad lines from helium, carbon and oxygen. Denoted [WR], they are much older objects descended from evolved low-mass stars and are closely related to white dwarfs, rather than to the very young, very massive population I stars that comprise the bulk of the WR class. These are now generally excluded from the class denoted as Wolf–Rayet stars, or referred to as Wolf–Rayet-type stars.

=== Metallicity ===
The numbers and properties of Wolf–Rayet stars vary with the chemical composition of their progenitor stars. A primary driver of this difference is the rate of mass loss at different levels of metallicity. Higher metallicity leads to high mass loss, which affects the evolution of massive stars and also the properties of Wolf–Rayet stars. Higher levels of mass loss cause stars to lose their outer layers before an iron core develops and collapses, so that the more massive red supergiants evolve back to hotter temperatures before exploding as a supernova, and the most massive stars never become red supergiants. In the Wolf–Rayet stage, higher mass loss leads to stronger depletion of the layers outside the convective core, lower hydrogen surface abundances and more rapid stripping of helium to produce a WC spectrum.

These trends can be observed in the various galaxies of the local group, where metallicity varies from near-solar levels in the Milky Way, somewhat lower in M31, lower still in the Large Magellanic Cloud, and much lower in the Small Magellanic Cloud. Strong metallicity variations are seen across individual galaxies, with M33 and the Milky Way showing higher metallicities closer to the centre, and M31 showing higher metallicity in the disk than in the halo. Thus the SMC is seen to have few WR stars compared to its stellar formation rate and no WC stars at all (one star has a WO spectral type), the Milky Way has roughly equal numbers of WN and WC stars and a large total number of WR stars, and the other main galaxies have somewhat fewer WR stars and more WN than WC types. LMC, and especially SMC, Wolf–Rayets have weaker emission and a tendency to higher atmospheric hydrogen fractions. SMC WR stars almost universally show some hydrogen and even absorption lines even at the earliest spectral types, due to weaker winds not entirely masking the photosphere.

The maximum mass of a main-sequence star that can evolve through a red supergiant phase and back to a WNL star is calculated to be around 20 M_{☉} in the Milky Way, 32 M_{☉} in the LMC, and over 50 M_{☉} in the SMC. The more evolved WNE and WC stages are only reached by stars with an initial mass over 25 M_{☉} at near-solar metallicity, over 60 M_{☉} in the LMC. Normal single star evolution is not expected to produce any WNE or WC stars at SMC metallicity.

=== Rotation ===
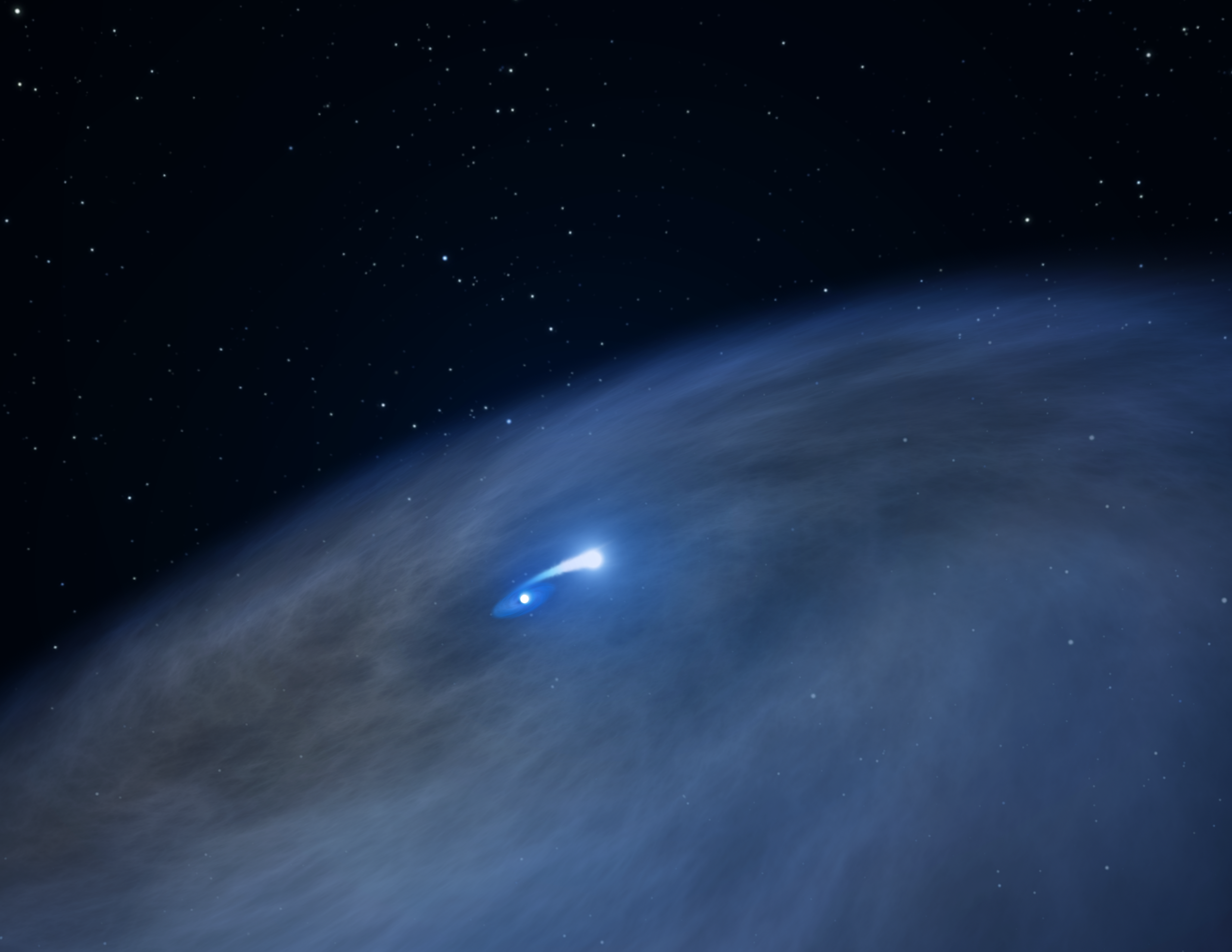
Artist's illustration of gas disk around massive hydrogen-rich WR 122

Mass loss is influenced by a star's rotation rate, especially strongly at low metallicity. Fast rotation contributes to mixing of core fusion products through the rest of the star, enhancing surface abundances of heavy elements, and driving mass loss. Fast rotation causes stars to remain on the main sequence longer than slow-rotating stars, evolve more quickly away from the red supergiant phase, or even evolve directly from the main sequence to hotter temperatures for very high masses, high metallicity or very rapid rotation.

Stellar mass loss produces a loss of angular momentum and this quickly brakes the rotation of massive stars. Very massive stars at near-solar metallicity should be braked almost to a standstill while still on the main sequence, while at SMC metallicity they can continue to rotate rapidly even at the highest observed masses. Rapid rotation of massive stars may account for the unexpected properties and numbers of SMC WR stars, for example their relatively high temperatures and luminosities.

=== Binaries ===
Massive stars in binary systems can develop into Wolf–Rayet stars due to stripping by a companion rather than inherent mass loss due to a stellar wind. This process is relatively insensitive to the metallicity or rotation of the individual stars and is expected to produce a consistent set of WR stars across all the local group galaxies. As a result, the fraction of WR stars produced through the binary channel, and therefore the number of WR stars observed to be in binaries, should be higher in low metallicity environments. Calculations suggest that the binary fraction of WR stars observed in the SMC should be as high as 98%, although less than half are actually observed to have a massive companion. The binary fraction in the Milky Way is around 20%, in line with theoretical calculations.

== Nebulae ==
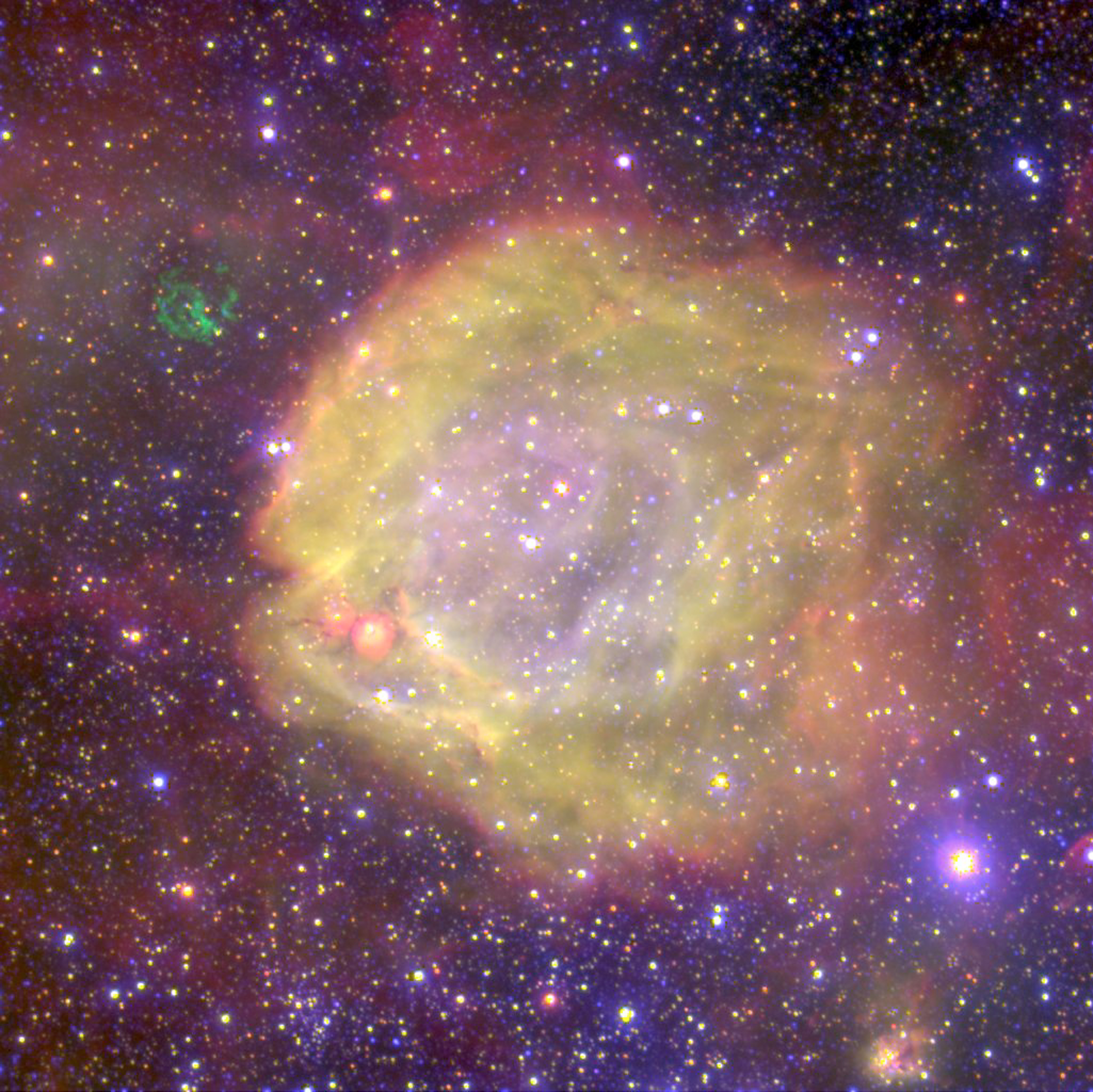
AB7 produces one of the highest excitation nebulae in the Magellanic Clouds.

A significant proportion of WR stars are surrounded by nebulosity associated directly with the star, not just the normal background nebulosity associated with any massive star forming region, and not a planetary nebula formed by a post-AGB star. The nebulosity presents a variety of forms and classification has been difficult. Many were originally catalogued as planetary nebulae and sometimes only a careful multi-wavelength study can distinguish a planetary nebula around a low mass post-AGB star from a similarly shaped nebula around a more massive core helium-burning star.

== Wolf–Rayet galaxies ==
A Wolf–Rayet galaxy is a type of starburst galaxy where a sufficient number of WR stars exist that their characteristic emission line spectra become visible in the overall spectrum of the galaxy. Specifically a broad emission feature due to the 468.6 nm He ii and nearby spectral lines is the defining characteristic of a Wolf–Rayet galaxy. The relatively short lifetime of WR stars means that the starbursts in such galaxies must have occurred within the last few million years, and must have lasted less than a million years or else the WR emission would be swamped by large numbers of other luminous stars.

== Evolution ==
Theories about how WR stars form, develop, and die have been slow to form compared to the explanation of less extreme stellar evolution. They are rare, distant, and often obscured, and even into the 21st century many aspects of their lives are unclear.

=== History ===
Although Wolf–Rayet stars have been clearly identified as an unusual and distinctive class of stars since the 19th century, the nature of these stars was uncertain until towards the end of the 20th century. Before the 1960s, even the classification of WR stars was highly uncertain, and their nature and evolution was essentially unknown. The very similar appearance of the central stars of planetary nebulae (CSPNe) and the much more luminous classical WR stars contributed to the uncertainty.

By about 1960, the distinction between CSPNe and massive luminous classical WR stars was more clear. Studies showed that they were small dense stars surrounded by extensive circumstellar material, but not yet clear whether the material was expelled from the star or contracting onto it. The unusual abundances of nitrogen, carbon, and oxygen, as well as the lack of hydrogen, were recognised, but the reasons remained obscure. It was recognised that WR stars were very young and very rare, but it was still open to debate whether they were evolving towards or away from the main sequence.

By the 1980s, WR stars were accepted as the descendants of massive OB stars, although their exact evolutionary state in relation to the main sequence and other evolved massive stars was still unknown. Theories that the preponderance of WR stars in massive binaries and their lack of hydrogen could be due to gravitational stripping had been largely ignored or abandoned. WR stars were being proposed as possible progenitors of supernovae, and particularly the newly-discovered type Ib supernovae, lacking hydrogen but apparently associated with young massive stars.

By the start of the 21st century, WR stars were largely accepted as massive stars that had exhausted their core hydrogen, left the main sequence, and expelled most of their atmospheres, leaving behind a small hot core of helium and heavier fusion products.

=== Current models ===
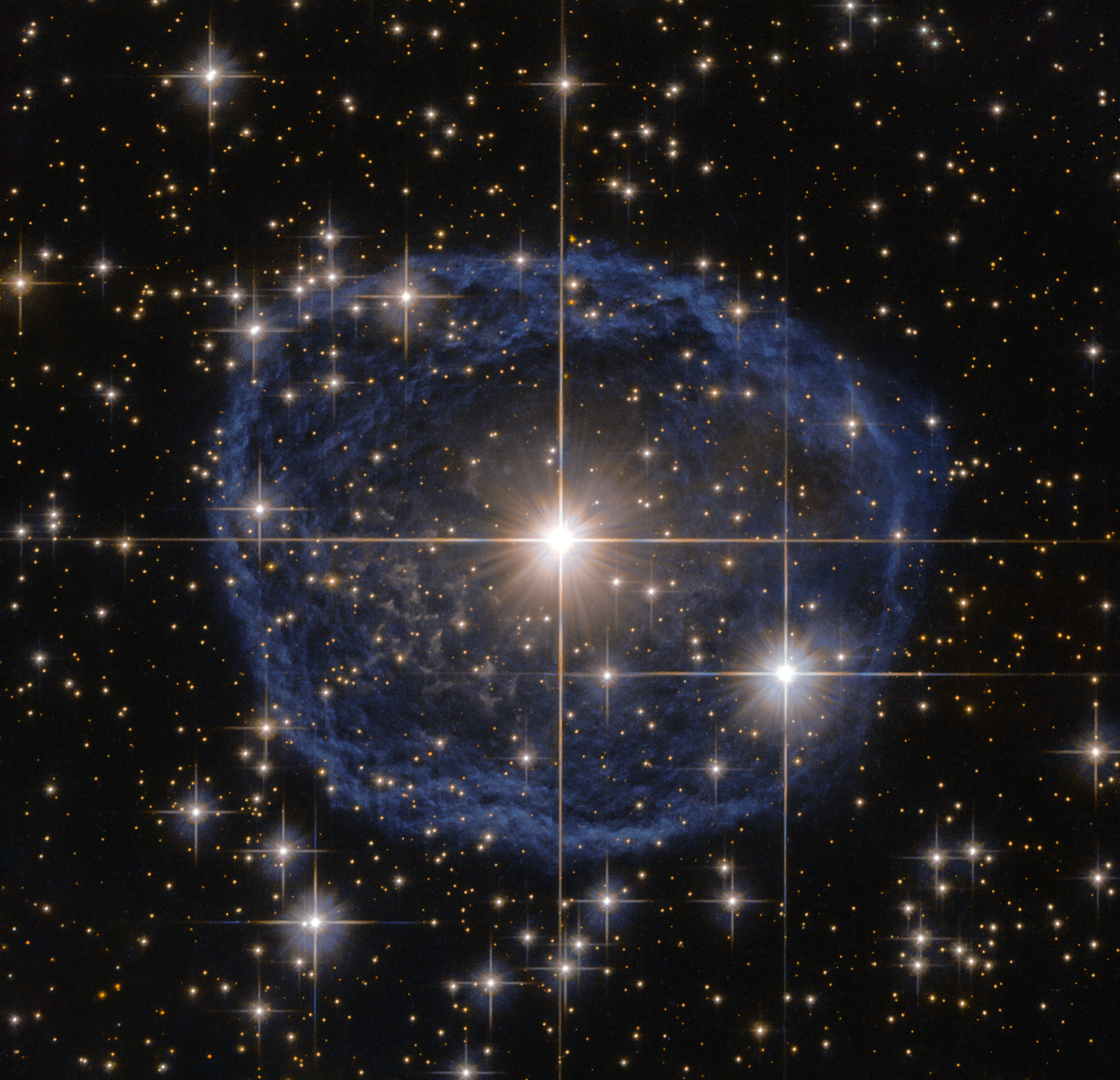
WR 31a is surrounded by a blue bubble created by a powerful stellar wind impacting material expelled during earlier stages of the star's life (ESA/Hubble & NASA Acknowledgement: Judy Schmidt).

Most WR stars, the classical population I type, are now understood as being a natural stage in the evolution of the most massive stars (not counting the less common planetary nebula central stars), either after a period as a red supergiant, after a period as a blue supergiant, or directly from the most massive main-sequence stars. Only the lower mass red supergiants are expected to explode as a supernova at that stage, while more massive red supergiants progress back to hotter temperatures as they expel their atmospheres. Some explode while at the yellow hypergiant or LBV stage, but many become Wolf–Rayet stars. They have lost or burnt almost all of their hydrogen and are now fusing helium in their cores, or heavier elements for a very brief period at the end of their lives.

Massive main-sequence stars create a very hot core which fuses hydrogen very rapidly via the CNO process and results in strong convection throughout the whole star. This causes mixing of helium to the surface, a process that is enhanced by rotation, possibly by differential rotation where the core is spun up to a faster rotation than the surface. Such stars also show nitrogen enhancement at the surface at a very young age, caused by changes in the proportions of carbon and nitrogen due to the CNO cycle. The enhancement of heavy elements in the atmosphere, as well as increases in luminosity, create strong stellar winds which are the source of the emission line spectra. These stars develop an Of spectrum, Of* if they are sufficiently hot, which develops into a WNh spectrum as the stellar winds increase further. This explains the high mass and luminosity of the WNh stars, which are still burning hydrogen at the core and have lost little of their initial mass. These will eventually expand into blue supergiants (LBVs?) as hydrogen at the core becomes depleted, or if mixing is efficient enough (e.g. through rapid rotation) they may progress directly to WN stars without hydrogen.

WR stars are likely to end their lives violently rather than fade away to a white dwarf. Thus every star with an initial mass more than about 9 times the Sun would inevitably result in a supernova explosion (with the exception of direct collapse), many of them from the WR stage.

A simple progression of WR stars from low to hot temperatures, resulting finally in WO-type stars, is not supported by observation. WO-type stars are extremely rare and all the known examples are more luminous and more massive than the relatively common WC stars. Alternative theories suggest either that the WO-type stars are only formed from the most massive main-sequence stars, and/or that they form an extremely short-lived end stage of just a few thousand years before exploding, with the WC phase corresponding to the core helium burning phase and the WO phase to nuclear burning stages beyond. It is still unclear whether the WO spectrum is purely the result of ionisation effects at very high temperature, reflects an actual chemical abundance difference, or if both effects occur to varying degrees.

Schematic evolution of stars by initial mass (at solar metallicity)
Initial mass (M_{☉})	Evolutionary sequence	Supernova type
~250+		None
~140– ~250	WNh-WNE-WO	Ic/Pair-instability
120– ~140	WNh → WN → WC → WO	Ic
60–120	O → Of → WNh ↔ LBV →[WNL]	IIn
45–60	O → WNh → LBV/WNE? → WO	Ib/c
35–45	O → RSG → WNE → WC	Ib
25–35	O → RSG ↔ (YHG) ↔ BSG (blue loops)	II-L (or IIb)
8–20	B → RSG	II-P

Key:

- O: O-type main-sequence star
- Of: evolved O-type showing N and He emission
- BSG: blue supergiant
- RSG: red supergiant
- YHG: yellow hypergiant
- LBV: luminous blue variable
- WNh: WN plus hydrogen lines
- WNL: "late" WN-class Wolf–Rayet star (about WN6 to WN11)
- WNE: "early" WN-class Wolf–Rayet star (about WN2 to WN6)
- WN/WC: Transitional (transitioning from WN to WC) Wolf–Rayet star (may be WN#/WCE or WC#/WN)
- WC: WC-class Wolf–Rayet star
- WO: WO-class Wolf–Rayet star

Wolf–Rayet stars form from massive stars, although the evolved population I stars have lost half or more of their initial masses by the time they show a WR appearance. For example, γ^{2} Velorum A currently has a mass around 9 times the Sun, but began with a mass at least 40 times the Sun. High-mass stars are very rare, both because they form less often and because they have short lives. This means that Wolf–Rayet stars themselves are extremely rare because they only form from the most massive main-sequence stars and because they are a relatively short-lived phase in the lives of those stars. This also explains why Type Ib/c supernovae are less common than Type II, since they result from higher-mass stars.

WNh stars, spectroscopically similar but actually a much less evolved star which has only just started to expel its atmosphere, are an exception and still retain much of their initial mass. The most massive stars currently known are all WNh stars rather than O-type main-sequence stars, an expected situation because such stars show helium and nitrogen at the surface only a few thousand years after they form, possibly before they become visible through the surrounding gas cloud. An alternative explanation is that these stars are so massive that they could not form as normal main-sequence stars, instead being the result of mergers of less extreme stars.

The difficulties of modelling the observed numbers and types of Wolf–Rayet stars through single star evolution have led to theories that they form through binary interactions which could accelerate loss of the outer layers of a star through mass exchange. WR 122 is a potential example that has a flat disk of gas encircling the star, almost 2 trillion miles wide, and may have a companion star that stripped its outer envelope.

=== Supernovae ===
It is widely suspected that many Type Ib and Type Ic supernova progenitors are WR stars, although no conclusive identification has been made of such a progenitor.

Type Ib supernovae lack hydrogen lines in their spectra. The more common Type Ic supernovae lack both hydrogen and helium lines in their spectra. The expected progenitors for such supernova are massive stars that respectively lack hydrogen in their outer layers, or lack both hydrogen and helium. WR stars are just such objects. All WR stars lack hydrogen and in some WR stars, most notably the WO group, helium is also strongly depleted. WR stars are expected to experience core collapse when they have generated an iron core, and resulting supernova explosions would be of Type Ib or Ic. In some cases it is possible that direct collapse of the core to a black hole would not produce a visible explosion.

WR stars are very luminous due to their high temperatures but not visually bright, especially the hottest examples that are expected to make up most supernova progenitors. Theory suggests that the progenitors of Type Ibc supernovae observed to date would not be bright enough to be detected, although they place constraints on the properties of those progenitors. A possible progenitor star which has disappeared at the location of supernova iPTF13bvn may be a single WR star, although other analyses favour a less massive binary system with a stripped star or helium giant. The only other possible WR supernova progenitor is for SN 2017ein, and again it is uncertain whether the progenitor is a single massive WR star or binary system.

In 2022 astronomers from the Gran Telescopio Canarias reported the first supernova explosion of a Wolf–Rayet star. SN 2019hgp was a Type Icn supernova and is also the first in which the element neon has been detected.

Stellar winds

Wolf Rayets stars are characterised by extremely strong stellar winds that cause them to lose a large amount of mass over a short periods of time.These winds are primarialy caused due the radiation from the outer layers of the stars surface.Metal ions scatter across several spectral lines,transferring momentum from the radiation to the surrounding gas and accelerating it forward

Wolf–Rayet (WR) stars typically lose mass via strong stellar winds at rates around $(10^{-5}\ M_\odot \text{yr}^{-1})$ depending on subtype, clumping corrections, and metallicity) which translates to about four earths an year

Wind speed can vary from 1000-3000 km/s its fastest about 11,000 times more than the speed of sound

WR stars are not unifrom in ature they have a clumping factor of about 5/100,thus sometimes miscalculations do occour in a magnitude of 2-4

Using the formula $lwind=Mv2/2$[note M doest mean Mass ]then luminal velocity reaches 6.3 x 10 to the power 30 joules with such intense enegy we could supply indias elecity for 1.10 Billion years the total kinetic energy is 7 into ten power 50 erg, so intense is this that there woul be enoogh energy to heat all Earth's oceans by approximately 10 billion billion °C

== Examples ==
By far the most visible example of a Wolf–Rayet star is γ^{2} Velorum (WR 11), which is a bright naked eye star for those located south of 40 degrees northern latitude, although most of the light comes from an O7.5 giant companion. Due to the exotic nature of its spectrum (bright emission lines in lieu of dark absorption lines) it is dubbed the "Spectral Gem of the Southern Skies". The only other Wolf–Rayet star brighter than magnitude 6 is θ Muscae (WR 48), a triple star with two O class companions. Both are WC stars. The "ex" WR star WR 79a (HR 6272) is brighter than magnitude 6 but is now considered to be a peculiar O8 supergiant with strong emission. The next brightest at magnitude 6.4 is WR 22, a massive binary with a WN7h primary.

The most massive and most luminous star currently known, R136a1, is also a Wolf–Rayet star of the WNh type that is still fusing hydrogen in its core. This type of star, which includes many of the most luminous and most massive stars, is very young and usually found only in the centre of the densest star clusters. Occasionally a runaway WNh star such as VFTS 682 is found outside such clusters, probably having been ejected from a multiple system or by interaction with other stars.

An example of a triple star system containing a Wolf–Rayet binary is Apep. It releases huge amounts of carbon dust driven by their extreme stellar winds. As the two stars orbit one another, the dust gets wrapped into a glowing sooty tail.

All of the very hottest non-degenerate stars (the hottest few) are Wolf–Rayet stars, the hottest of which being WR 102, which seems to be as hot as 210,000 K, followed by WR 142 which is around 200,000 K in temperature. LMC195-1, located in the Large Magellanic Cloud, should have a similar temperature, but at the moment this temperature is unknown.

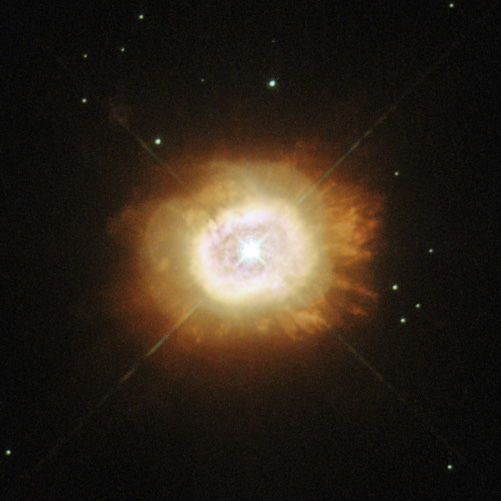
HD 184738, also known as Campbell's star. This is actually a planetary nebula and the central star is an old low-mass star unlike the main class of massive Wolf–Rayet stars.

HD 45166 has been described as the most magnetic massive star known and as the first magnetic known Wolf-Rayet star.

Only a minority of planetary nebulae have WR type central stars, but a considerable number of well-known planetary nebulae do have them.

Planetary nebulae with WR type central stars
Planetary nebula	Central star type
NGC 2452	[WO1]
NGC 2867	[WO2]
NGC 5189 (Spiral Planetary Nebula)	[WO1]
NGC 2371-2	[WO1]
NGC 5315	[WO4]
NGC 40	[WC8]
NGC 7026	[WO3]
NGC 1501	[WO4]
NGC 6751	[WO4]
NGC 6369 (Little Ghost Nebula)	[WO3]
MyCn18 (Hourglass Nebula)	[WC]–PG1159

== See also ==
- Markarian 50
- List of Wolf-Rayet stars
