= HD 110432 =

Star in the constellation Crux

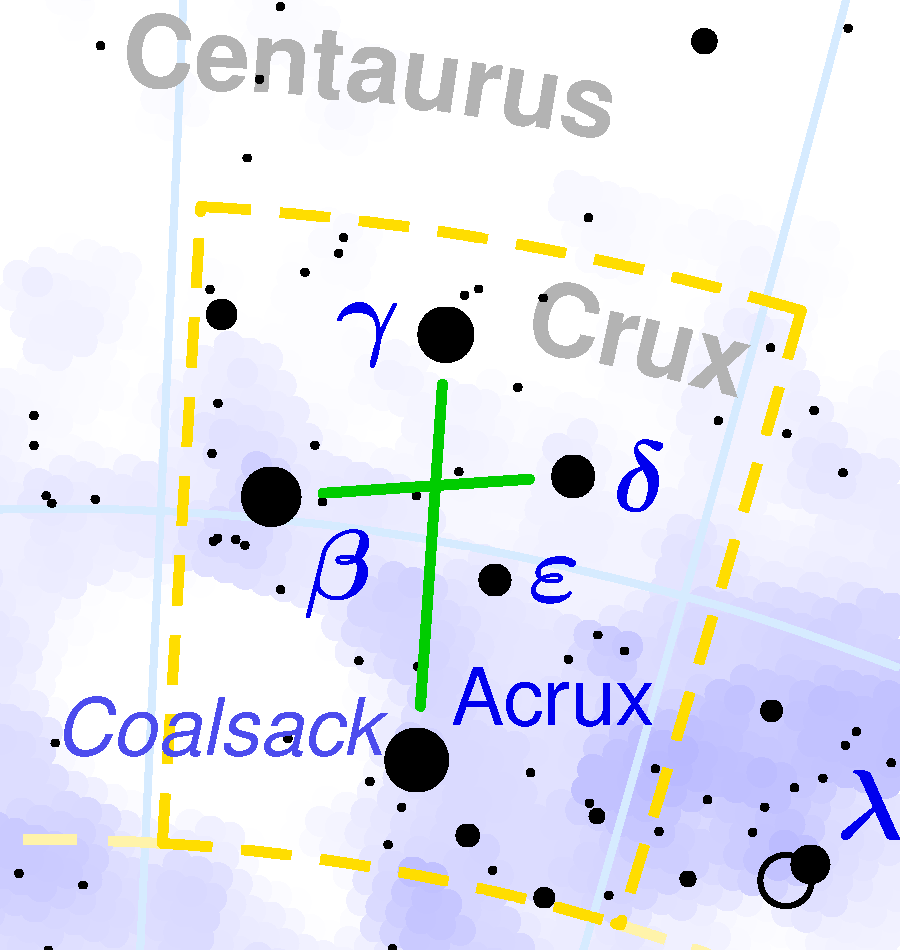
- Location of BZ Crucis (circled). The other star shown overlapping/underlying the dark nebula is HD 109000 (HR 4771) which is a red/brown star about half the distance to the nebula, having parallax of 12.8 ± 0.05 thus about 250 light years away

Observation data Epoch J2000 Equinox J2000
- Constellation: Crux
- Right ascension: 12^{h} 42^{m} 50.2656^{s}
- Declination: −63° 03′ 31.048″
- Apparent magnitude (V): 5.24 - 5.45

Characteristics
- Spectral type: B1IVe
- U−B color index: −0.82
- B−V color index: +0.27
- Variable type: γ Cas

Astrometry
Radial velocity (R_{v})	+35 km/s
Proper motion (μ)	RA: −12.512 mas/yr Dec.: −3.984 mas/yr
Parallax (π)	2.3834±0.1228 mas
Distance	1,370 ± 70 ly (420 ± 20 pc)
Absolute magnitude (M_{V})	−2.56

Details
Mass	9.6 M_{☉}
Radius	6.5±1.2 R_{☉}
Luminosity	1,153 L_{☉}
Surface gravity (log g)	3.5–3.9 cgs
Temperature	22,510–25,000 K
Rotational velocity (v sin i)	300–400 km/s

Other designations
- BZ Cru, HR 4830, CD-62 671, HD 110432, GCTP, SAO 252002, FK5 3015, HIP 62027.

Database references
SIMBAD	data

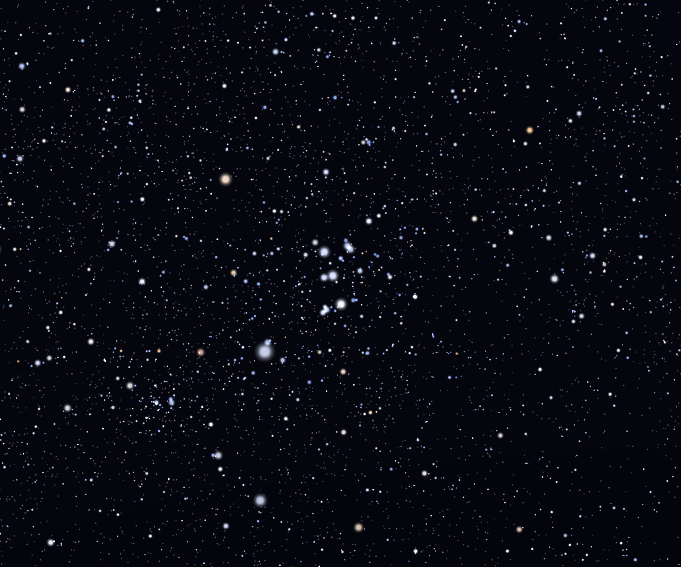
BZ Crucis is the bright star between the open clusters NGC 4609 and Hogg 15

HD 110432 is a Be star in the south-east of Crux, behind the center of the southern hemisphere's dark Coalsack Nebula. It has a stellar classification of B1IVe, which means it is a subgiant star of class B that displays emission lines in its spectrum. This is a variable star of the Gamma Cassiopeiae type, indicating it is a shell star with a circumstellar disk of gas about the equator, and has the variable star designation BZ Crucis. It is not known to be a member of a binary system, although it is probably a member of the open cluster NGC 4609. This star is moderately luminous in the X-ray band, with a variable energy emission of 10^{32–33} erg s^{−1} in the range 0.2−12 keV. The X-ray emission may be caused by magnetic activity, or possibly by accretion onto a white dwarf companion.

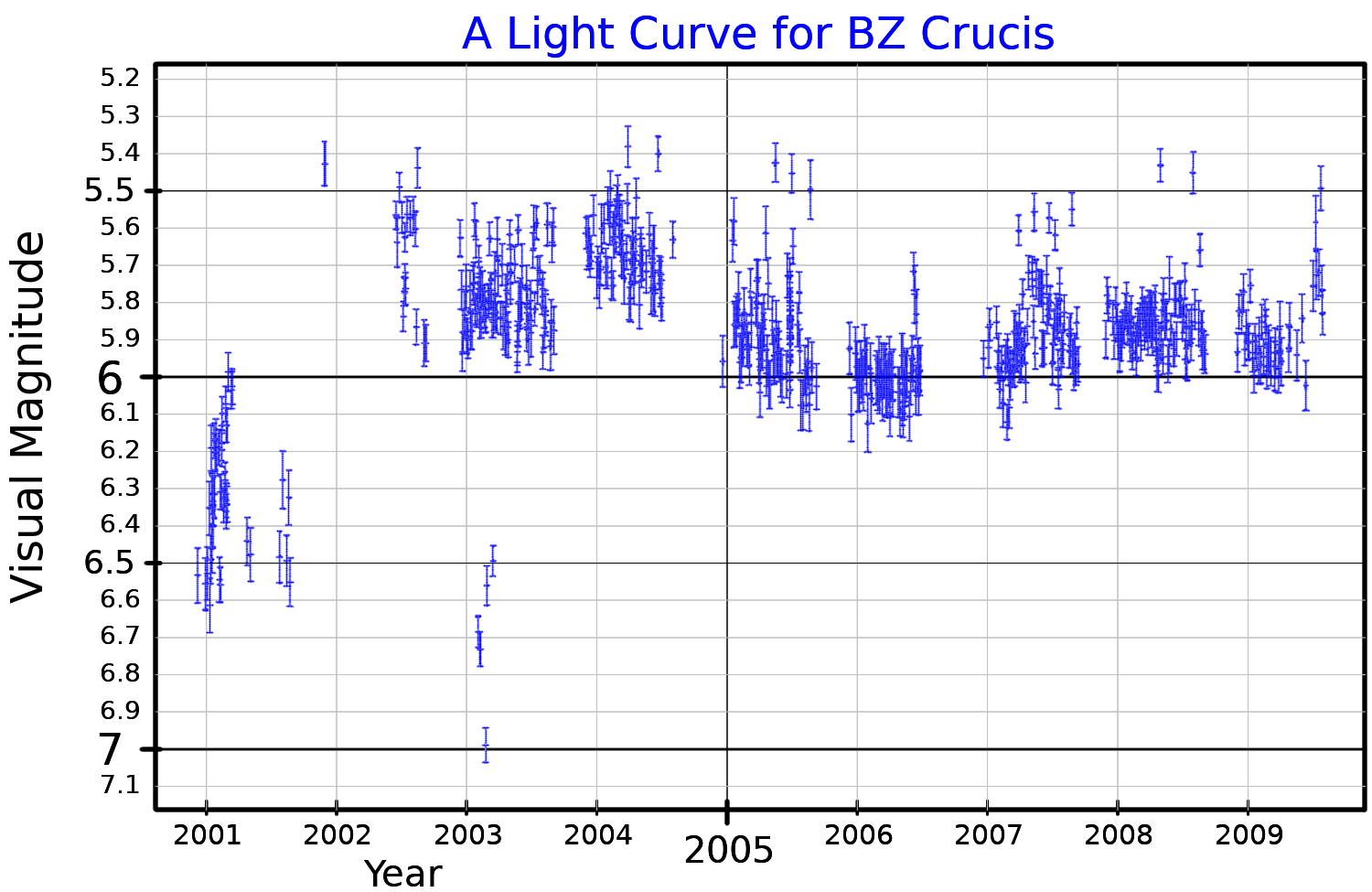
A visual band light curve for BZ Crucis, adapted from Sarty et al. (2011)

== Distance ==
The distance of 388 pc published in the 2007 new Hipparcos reduction is over twice the distance of the Coalsack Nebula. The distance from Gaia Data Release 2 is even further at 420 pc.
