= HD 45166 =

Star in the constellation Monoceros

Observation data Epoch J2000 Equinox ICRS
- Constellation: Monoceros
- Right ascension: 06^{h} 26^{m} 19.155^{s}
- Declination: +07° 58′ 28.06″
- Apparent magnitude (V): 9.88

Characteristics
- Spectral type: qWR + B7V
- U−B color index: −0.76
- B−V color index: −0.07
- Variable type: suspected

Astrometry
Radial velocity (R_{v})	7±5 km/s
Proper motion (μ)	RA: −0.389 mas/yr Dec.: −0.339 mas/yr
Parallax (π)	0.9955±0.0346 mas
Distance	991 pc

Orbit
Period (P)	8,200 days
Semi-major axis (a)	10.8±0.4 AU
Eccentricity (e)	0.46
Inclination (i)	49±11°
Periastron epoch (T)	2040.5+1.3 −1.1
Argument of periastron (ω) (secondary)	132±11°
Semi-amplitude (K_{2}) (secondary)	5.8±1.3 (B-type star) km/s

Details

qWR
Mass	2.03±0.44 M_{☉}
Radius	0.88±0.11 R_{☉}
Luminosity	6760±830 L_{☉}
Temperature	56000±6000 K
Rotation	124.82±0.21 days
Age	105 Myr

B
Mass	3.40±0.06 M_{☉}
Radius	2.63±0.41 R_{☉}
Luminosity	178±22 L_{☉}
Temperature	13000±500 K
Age	105 Myr

Other designations
- TYC 732-754-1, ALS 8946, BD+08 1332, 2MASS J06261915+0758280

Database references
SIMBAD	data

HD 45166 is a binary consisting of a so-called quasi Wolf–Rayet (qWR) star and a B-type main-sequence star, near the cluster NGC 2244, in the constellation of Monoceros. A quasi Wolf–Rayet star has a spectrum resembling those of Wolf–Rayet stars, but being less massive and luminous than a true Wolf–Rayet. The primary of HD 45166 is currently the only known example of a qWR star.

In 2023, the primary of HD 45166 was also found to be extremely magnetic, the most magnetic massive star known. It is currently the only Wolf-Rayet star in which a significant magnetic field was measured. It has a magnetic field strength of up to 43 kG, or about 43,000 times the Sun's magnetic field strength. If it ends its life as a type Ib/IIb supernova, the remnant will likely be a magnetar.

== Properties ==
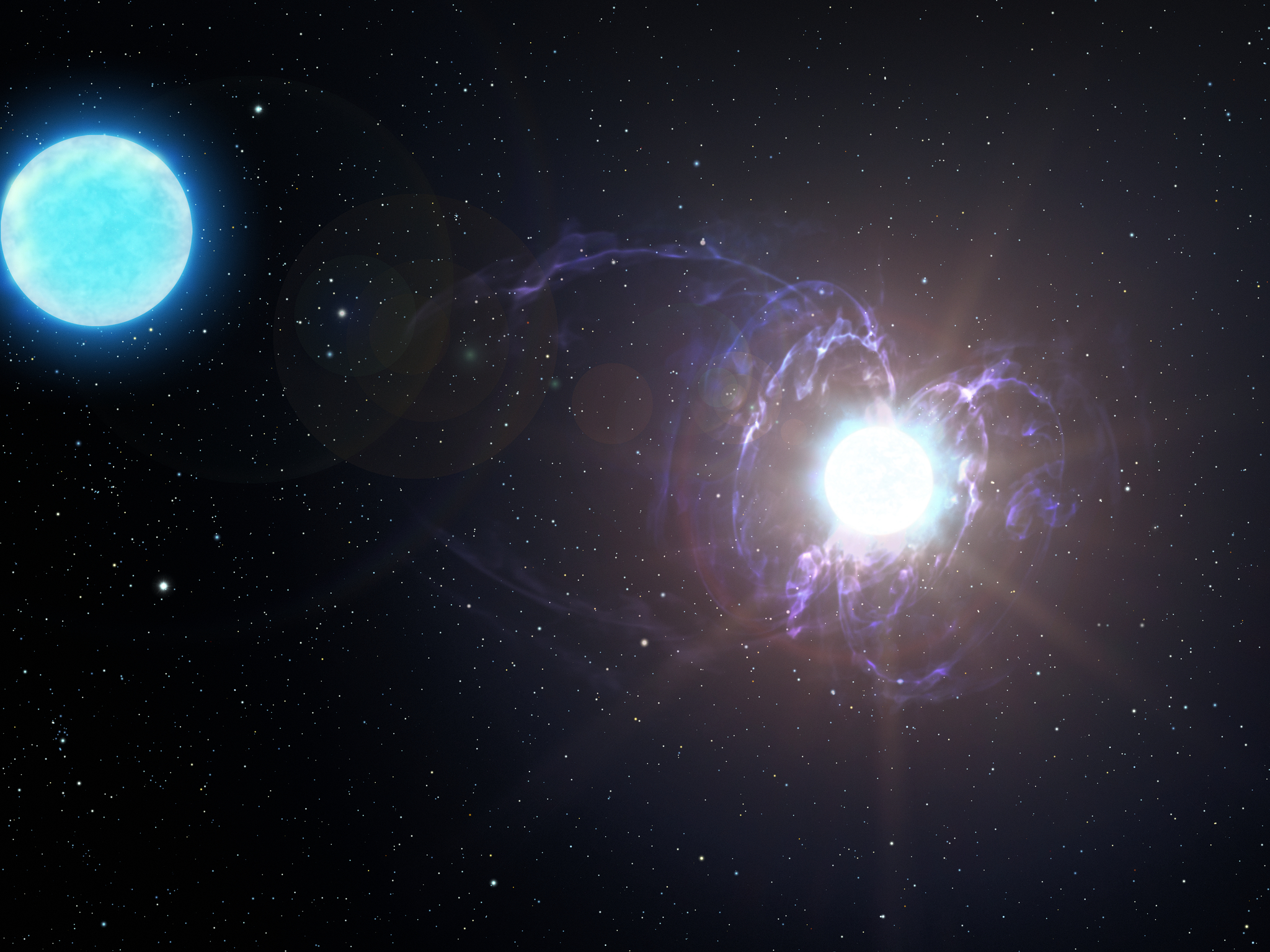
Artist's impression of HD 45166

HD 45166 is currently a wide binary made up of a hot, small quasi Wolf–Rayet star and a larger B-type star, with masses of 2.03 M_{☉} and 3.4 M_{☉} respectively. They are separated by approximately 10.5 AU and orbit each other every 8200 days, or every 22.5 years. The orbit is moderately eccentric, and inclined from our view at about 49°. The HD 45166 system is estimated to be around 105 million years old. The orbital period was formerly thought to have been 1.6 days, which would have made the primary about 4 M_{☉}, but a 2023 study instead identified this signal as a pulsation mode of the secondary.

The primary qWR star is slightly smaller than the Sun, with a surface temperature of 56,000 K. It is also mostly composed of helium, and is only composed of about 25% hydrogen. Some carbon, nitrogen and oxygen is also present in the star.

The B-type star is about two and a half times the size of the Sun, and has a temperature of about 13,000 K.

== Evolution ==
It is hard to explain the existence of the exotic qWR primary in HD 45166. A stellar merger from white dwarfs is extremely unstable, and would explode after about 10,000 years. Therefore, the most likely scenario for the creation of the qWR primary would be the merger of two helium stars in a tight binary.

The system likely formed as a triple star system, with a tight inner binary and a distant third star, which is now the B-type secondary star. In the tight binary, the more massive star expanded, and lost its outer layers via mass transfer to the secondary star, becoming a helium star. The same thing then happened to the secondary star of the tight binary, and so both stars became helium stars. Due to unstable mass transfer, a gaseous envelope formed around the two stars, causing them to lose orbital energy via friction, spiral inwards and eventually collide. This merger formed the quasi Wolf–Rayet primary of HD 45166 that we observe today.

=== Future evolution ===
The qWR primary of HD 45166 is currently burning helium in its core. After it has exhausted this, it will likely start shell burning, and expand, forming a supergiant of about 300 R_{☉} (well within its roche lobe). Then, it will either become a white dwarf composed mainly of oxygen, neon and magnesium or explode in a type Ib or IIb supernova. For the latter scenario, the remnant would be a neutron star, probably also with a very strong magnetic field, i.e. a magnetar.
