= NGC 4609 =

Open cluster in the constellation Crux

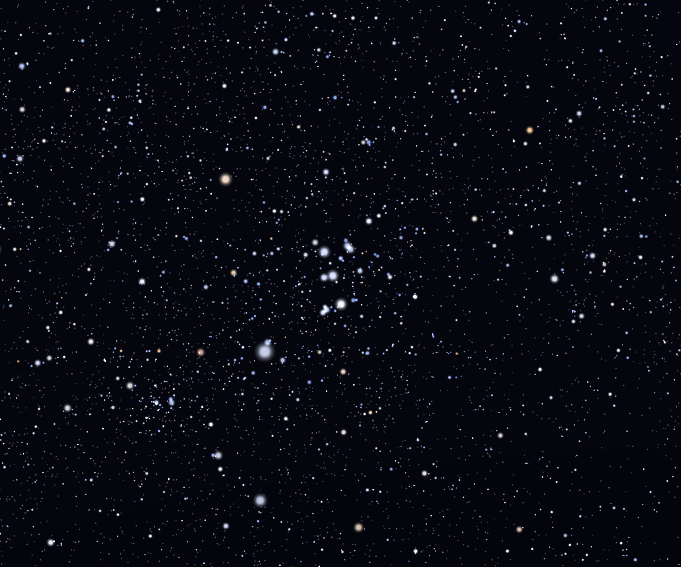
- NGC 4609 (taken from Stellarium)

Observation data (J2000 epoch)
- Right ascension: 12^{h} 42^{m} 19.7^{s}
- Declination: −62° 59′ 42″
- Distance: 4,500 ly (1,379 pc)
- Apparent magnitude (V): 6.9
- Apparent dimensions (V): 6.5′.

Physical characteristics
- Estimated age: 83.2 Myr
- Other designations: NGC 4609, Caldwell 98, Cr 263

Associations
- Constellation: Crux

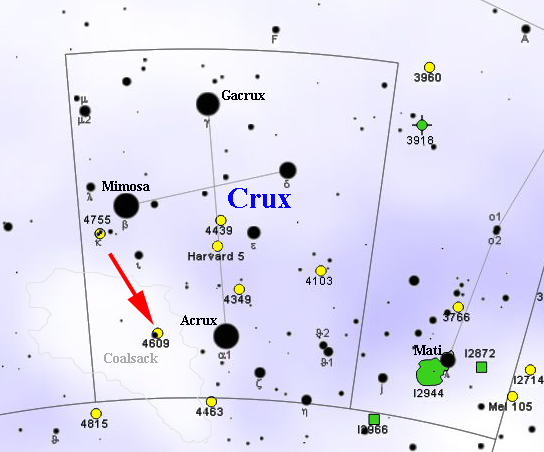
Map showing the location of NGC 4609

NGC 4609 (also known as Caldwell 98) is an open cluster of stars in the southern constellation of Crux. It was discovered on May 12, 1826 by the Scottish astronomer James Dunlop. The cluster has an apparent visual magnitude of 6.9 and spans an angular size of 6.5′. It is situated beyond the Coalsack Nebula at an estimated distance of 4,500 ly (1,379 pc) from the Sun.

This is an intermediate age cluster estimated at 83.2 Myr old. It is a poorly populated cluster with just one red giant member. 33 probable members have been identified, including the variable Be star BZ Crucis. The metallicity of the cluster, as measured by the abundance of iron, is slightly larger than in the Sun.
