= AB7 =

Binary star in the Small Magellanic Cloud in the constellation Tucana

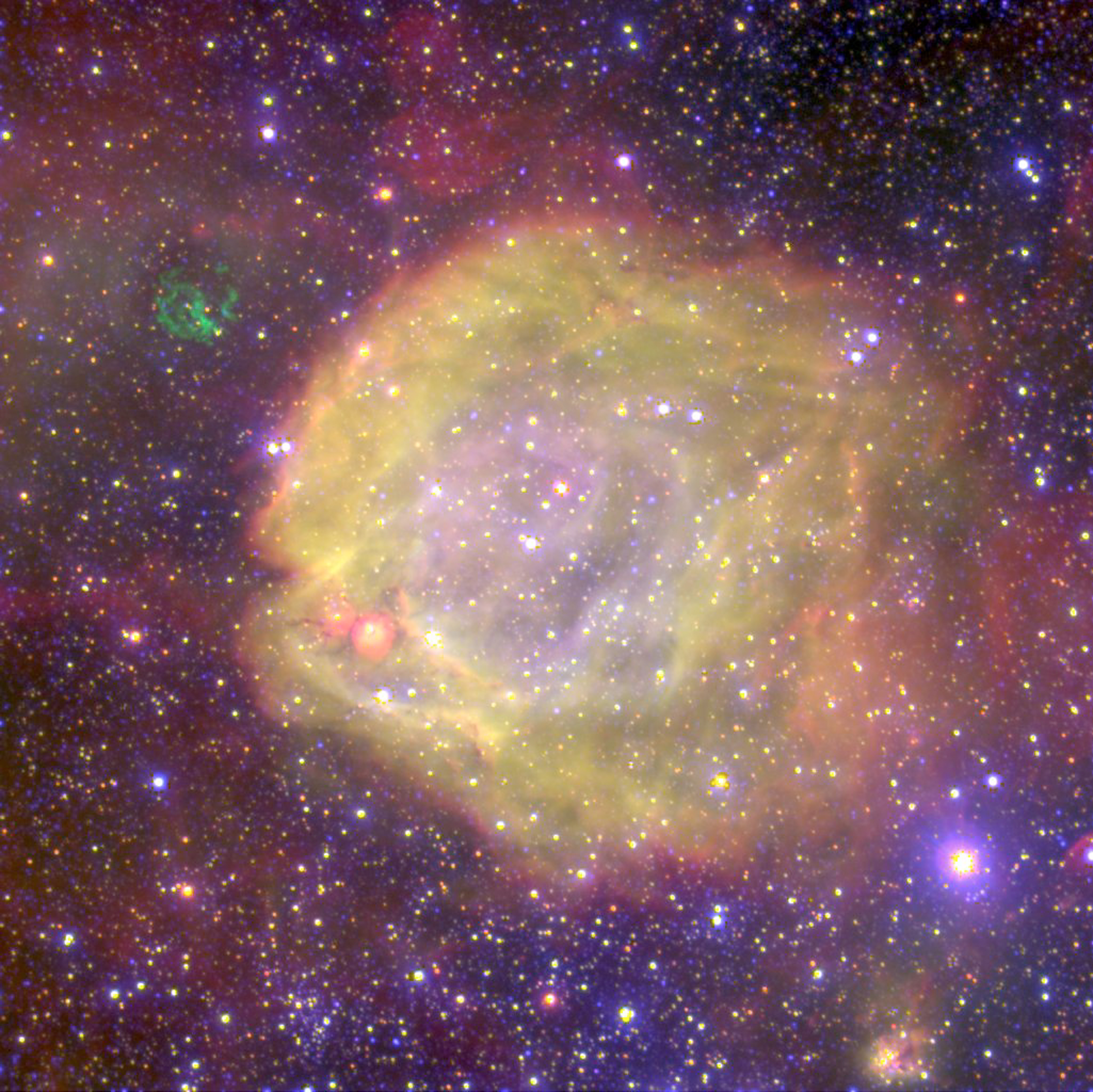
- AB7 is the brightest white star at the centre of the cavity within the nebula, not the brighter reddish star. False colour image: red is H_{I}; green is O_{III}; blue is He_{III}.

Observation data Epoch J2000.0 Equinox ICRS
- Constellation: Tucana
- Right ascension: 01^{h} 03^{m} 35.93^{s}
- Declination: −72° 03′ 22.0″
- Apparent magnitude (V): 13.016

Characteristics
- Spectral type: WN4 + O6I(f)
- U−B color index: −1.021
- B−V color index: −0.062

Astrometry
Radial velocity (R_{v})	172 km/s
Distance	197,000 ly (61,000 pc)
Absolute magnitude (M_{V})	−6.1 (−4.4 + −5.7)

Orbit
Period (P)	19.560±0.0005 d
Eccentricity (e)	0.07±0.02
Inclination (i)	68+22 −15°
Periastron epoch (T)	2,451,549.2±0.8
Argument of periastron (ω) (primary)	101±16°
Semi-amplitude (K_{1}) (primary)	196±4 km/s
Semi-amplitude (K_{2}) (secondary)	101±2 km/s

Details

WR
Mass	23 M_{☉}
Radius	3.4 R_{☉}
Luminosity	1,259,000 L_{☉}
Surface gravity (log g)	4.7 cgs
Temperature	105,000 K

O
Mass	44 M_{☉}
Radius	14 R_{☉}
Luminosity	316,000 L_{☉}
Surface gravity (log g)	3.6 cgs
Temperature	36,000 K
Rotational velocity (v sin i)	150 km/s
Age	3.4 Myr

Other designations
- AB 7, SMC WR 7, OGLE SMC-SC9 37124, SBC9 2395, AzV 336a

Database references
SIMBAD	data

AB7, also known as SMC WR7, is a binary star in the Small Magellanic Cloud. A Wolf–Rayet star and a supergiant companion of spectral type O orbit in a period of 19.56 days. The system is surrounded by a ring-shaped nebula known as a bubble nebula.

== Discovery ==
AB7 was first listed by Azzopardi and Vigneau as a probable member of the Small Magellanic Cloud and noted to be a Wolf Rayet star. It was numbered 336a, the "a" meaning it is an addition between 336 and 337 of the existing catalogue. The catalogue stars are referred to with the acronym Az or AzV, so AB7 is also called AzV 336a. A close companion is noted although at the distance of the SMC it is not really that close and not physically related.

The definitive catalogue of Wolf Rayet stars in the SMC was published shortly after by Azzopardi and Breysacher, with AB7 the seventh out of a grand total of eight stars. These are referred to as SMC WR stars, or SMC AB, or more commonly just AB.

== Nebula ==
Small Magellanic Cloud. N76 is the middle of the three brightest red H_{II} regions in a line below (north of) the centre.

AB7 lies at the centre of a bubble nebula shaped and ionised by powerful stellar winds from the stars within it. The nebula was first catalogued as the N76 and N76A H_{α} emission line nebulae. N76A is the brighter portion of the larger round N76 nebula towards bottom left in the images and N76B is the detached knot at bottom right. N76 lies between two other prominent H_{II} regions: the larger brighter N66, which contains the unusual HD 5980 LBV/WR/O triple system; and the fainter N78.

The nebula was catalogued at radio wavelengths as SMC DEM 123 and 124, corresponding to N76A and N76 respectively. DEM 124 is described as a shell surrounding DEM 123.

N76 is an H_{II} region about 5 arc-minutes wide, 40–50 parsecs. It has the appearance of a ring but is actually an approximately spherical shell, interstellar material sculpted and ionised by the winds of the central stars, similar to a planetary nebula but much larger. It also contains both singly and doubly ionised helium. Such He_{II} regions are rare and indicate an extremely hot ionising star. They are found only around a few of the hottest types of Wolf Rayet star.

N76 is described as containing the open cluster NGC 371, although the reverse may be more accurate. The stars of NGC 371 are scattered over twice the diameter of N76, around 100 parsecs, and might better be described as a stellar association than an open cluster. They can be seen as the higher density of stars in the lower half of the images. Hodge catalogued stellar associations in the SMC and Hodge 53 was defined to include NGC 371.

AB7 is sometimes described as being within N76A, but this is incorrect. N76A is the small dense H_{II} region SE of AB7, part of the "ring", while AB7 lies at the centre of the less dense nebulosity within the ring. It may already be the home of a new generation of stars; N76A hosts at least five hot young stars, including a probable O9 main sequence star at its centre.

A nearby unusual oxygen-rich supernova remnant has been intensively studied. It is visible as the knot of filaments growing green from ionised oxygen emission.

== The stars ==
=== Spectrum ===
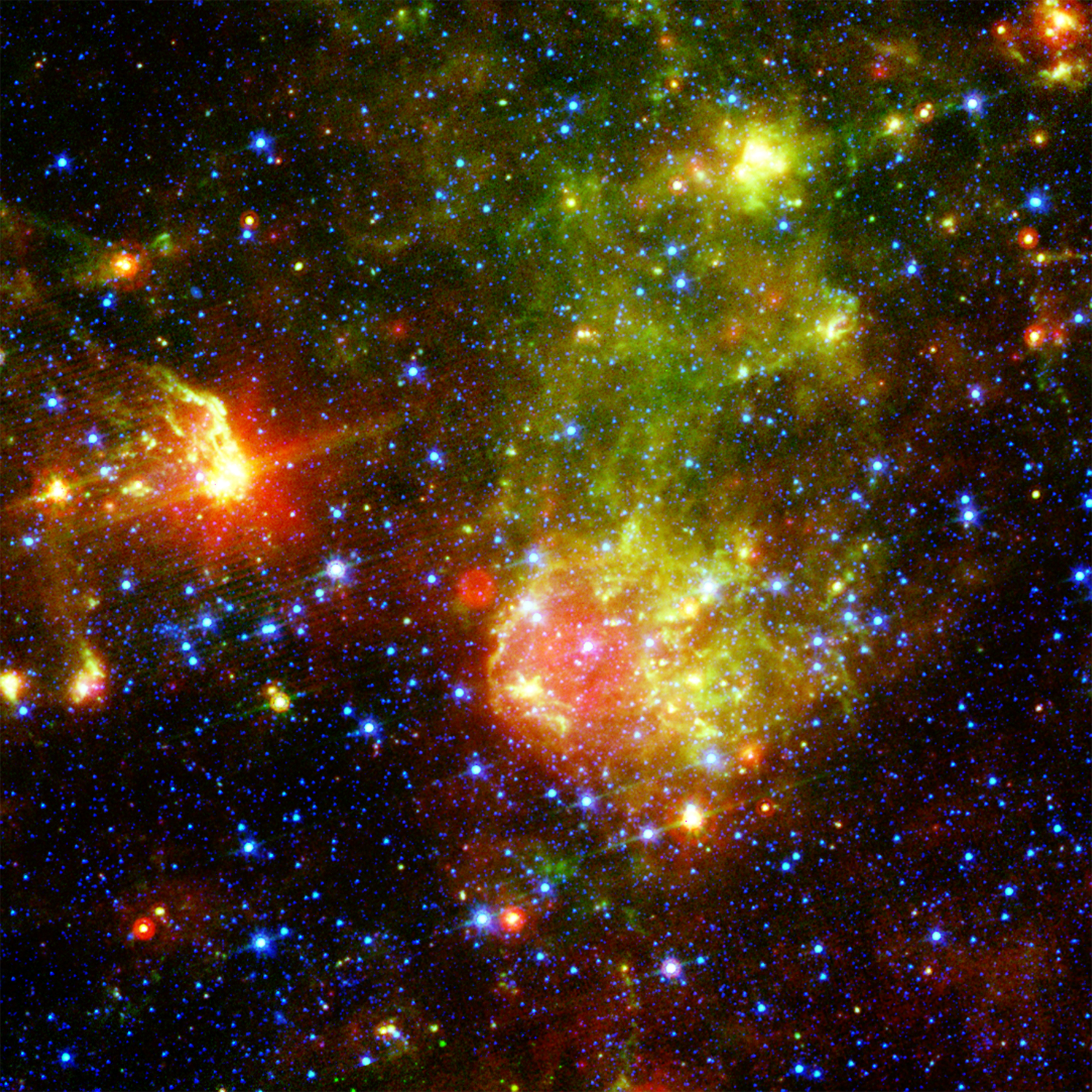
The bubble around AB7 in the infrared (Spitzer Space Telescope)

AB7 is clearly a Wolf Rayet star, showing characteristic broad emission lines. Narrow nebular emission lines are also seen, often overlaid on the emission from the star. There are no strong absorption lines, but the continuum background of the spectrum is much stronger than a single WR star and several of the emission lines are anomalously weak, so an OB companion was always assumed.

The electromagnetic radiation of the primary is concentrated in the far ultraviolet, so the visual and ultraviolet spectra are dominated by the secondary star. Classification of both stars is complicated by line blending. When first discovered, it was classified as "WR:", while the SMC WR catalogue considered it a peculiar WN3+OB.

An early detailed analysis gave spectral types of WN1 (a type used by some authors for a few years, equivalent to the modern WN2) and O6IIIf for the two stars. High resolution spectra allowing separation of the lines from each component during their orbit gave WN2 + O6I(f) with considerable uncertainty. Faint N_{III} lines are seen which would not normally be found in such an early WN star, but these were assigned to the companion. Another analysis of similar spectra gives WN4 for the Wolf Rayet component based on the relative strength of He_{II} and He_{I} emission and the presence of H_{ε} emission. The luminosity-sensitive lines of the O star are largely obscured by emission from the primary, but it is assumed to be an evolved star because of the nitrogen emission, and a supergiant on the basis of the absolute magnitude.

AB7 is a strong X-ray source clearly detected by ROSAT and Chandra. This is expected for a close WR/O binary, due to colliding winds being shocked to extreme temperatures. The x-ray luminosity varies during the orbit. Although the stellar winds of WR stars at low SMC metallicities are expected to be, and are observed to be, weaker than in galactic and LMC WR stars, the X-ray luminosity is comparable to similar galactic binaries. Auger ionization causes the C_{IV} ground state to be depopulated, further complicating the spectrum.

=== Orbit ===
The spectrum of AB7 shows radial velocity variation of the WR emission lines and narrower absorption lines with a well-defined period of 19.56 days. The shifts in the two sets of lines are not quite synchronised: the emission line velocities peak about one day later than the absorption lines. Theories include that this might be related to the colliding winds or possibly due to an asymmetric disc around the stars.

The relative size of the spectral line Doppler shifts indicates the mass ratio of the two stars, which shows that the secondary has around twice the mass of the primary. The shape of the radial velocity curves can be used to derive the eccentricity of the orbits which are nearly circular. Eclipses of the stars are not seen, but a very small light variation could be due to wind eclipses which would constrain the inclination to near 60°. Calibrating the secondary mass to match its spectral type gives an orbital inclination of 68°. The derived size of the orbit depends on the inclination; for an inclination of 68° the semi-major axis is 123 R_{☉}.

=== Properties ===
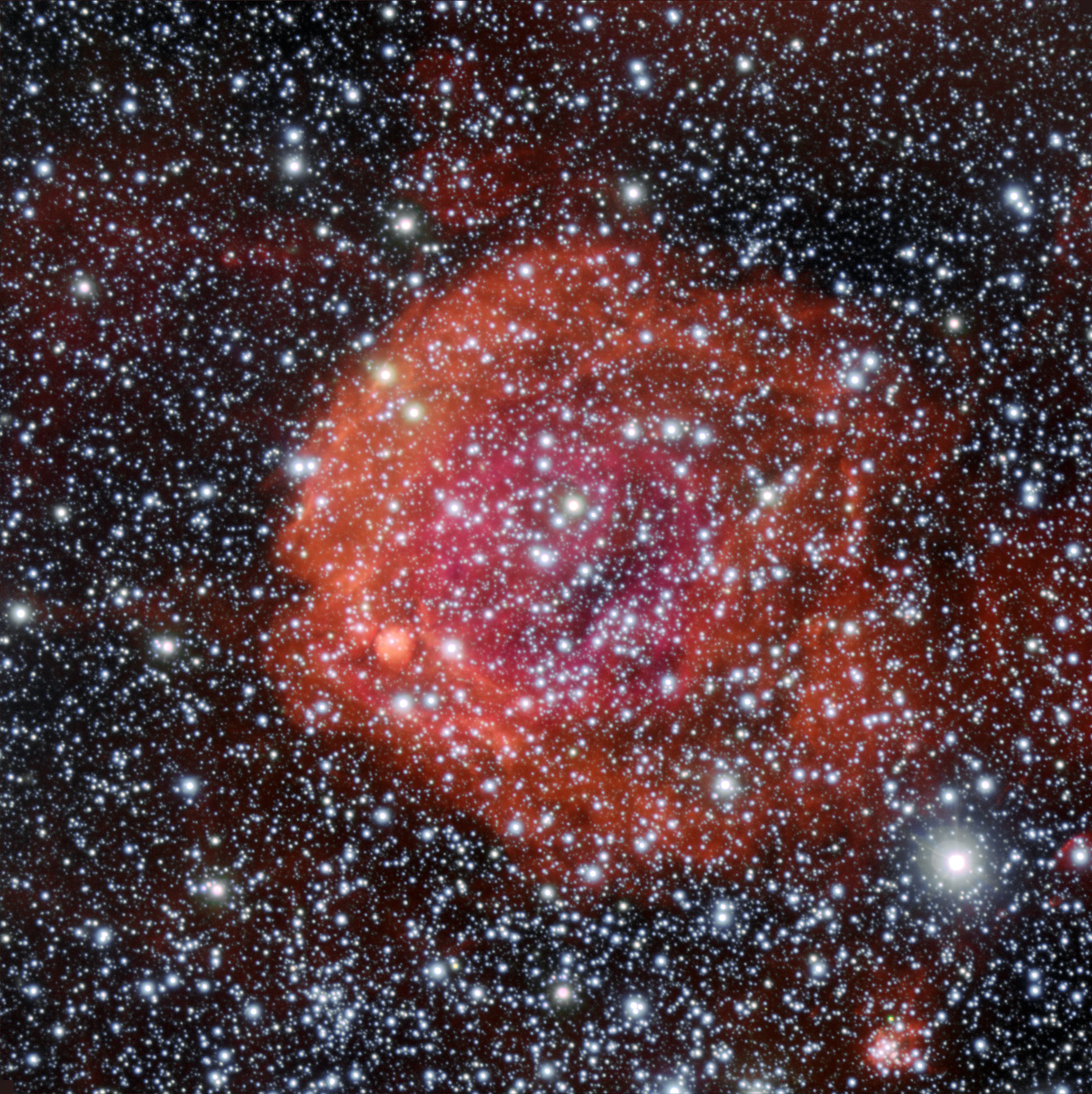
N76 in H_{α} (red), He_{I} (green), and He_{II} (blue)

The total visual brightness of AB7 can be determined fairly accurately at absolute magnitude (M_{V}) −6.1, 23,500 times brighter than the sun. The components cannot be observed separately and the contribution from each component can only be estimated. The O star dominates the visual spectrum and produces around 70% of the brightness, leading to M_{V} −5.7, and −4.4 for the primary.

The temperature of a star can be determined in several different ways: from the spectral type; directly from atmospheric models; and from the ionising effects of its radiation. Accurate calibrations are available for the temperatures of class-O stars, although these are slightly different for SMC metallicity and for stars of different luminosity classes. The temperatures for WR spectral classes are less precisely defined, especially for the SMC and especially for the hottest classes. AB7 completely ionises the surrounding interstellar material to a distance of 20 parsecs and this can be used to derive the temperature and luminosity of the ionising star. This level of ionisation cannot be achieved by an O6 star, so will be almost entirely due to the WR component. However, the ionisation is beyond what would be caused by the hottest model, a 120,000K star. An earlier attempt at the same calculation gave a blackbody temperature of 80,000K. The temperatures can be calculated directly by modelling the atmospheres of both stars to reproduce the observed spectrum in detail. This method results in a temperature of 106,000 K for the WR component and 36,000 K for the O companion. The effective temperature is useful for modelling the atmosphere and comparison between stars, but a typical "observed" temperature at optical depth 2/3 can be significantly different for stars with a dense stellar wind. In the case of the WR primary star, the optical depth temperature is 96,000 K.

The simplest way to measure the luminosity of a star is to observe its radiated output at all wavelengths (the spectral energy distribution or SED) and sum them together. This method is impractical for AB7 because the majority of the radiation occurs in the far ultraviolet. A more common method is to measure the visual luminosity and apply a bolometric correction to give the total luminosity at all wavelengths, although the size of the bolometric correction is extremely sensitive to the effective temperature. Following this method gives a luminosity of 1,270,000 L_{☉} for the primary. The luminosity can also be derived from the observed levels of ionisation. Assuming the older temperature of 80,000K gives 1,000,000 L_{☉}. Modelling the atmospheres gives luminosities for the WR and O component of over 1,000,000 L_{☉} and 316,000 L_{☉} respectively.

The radius of a star with strong stellar wind is poorly defined since any strong density discontinuity that might be defined as a surface is entirely hidden from view. Commonly used definitions of the radius in such cases include: a temperature radius; an optical depth radius; and a transformed radius. The differences are only significant in the case of the WR component. The temperature radius is the radius of a uniform disc that would produce the known luminosity at the calculated effective temperature, and is 3.4 R_{☉}. The radius at optical depth 2/3 is 4.0 R_{☉}. The transformed radius is a value used in the modelling of the atmosphere and is 5.6 R_{☉}. The O-component radius is 14-15 R_{☉}.

The masses of each component in the AB7 system can be determined from the binary orbit. The minimum masses are found to be 18 M_{☉} and 34 M_{☉} respectively for the primary and secondary. With the assumption of an inclination of 60°, the actual masses are 28 M_{☉} and 54 M_{☉}. The secondary is more massive and visually brighter, but not more luminous.

Both components of AB7 have powerful stellar winds and are losing mass rapidly. Wind speeds of 1,700 km/s for the primary and 1,500 km/s for the secondary are calculated, with mass loss from the primary a billion times higher than the sun, and 100 million times for the secondary star. The WR wind is sufficiently dense that it obscures the photosphere of the star, leading to the unusual spectrum consisting almost entirely of emission lines broadened by the rapid expansion and turbulence of the wind. The high wind speeds and closeness of the stars mean that where the winds collide the material is shocked to temperatures over 20 million K, causing it to emit hard X-rays.

=== Evolution ===
Supernova type by initial mass and metallicity

A model has been developed to show the evolution of a binary system leading to the currently observed state of AB7. The initial state has an 80 M_{☉} primary and 40 M_{☉} secondary in an orbit about twice its current size. The more massive primary leaves the main sequence after approximately 3.3 million years and overflows its roche lobe. In around 30,000 years it loses 30 M_{☉}, only a small proportion of which is accreted by the secondary star. Relatively soon afterwards, the system settles to its current state.

The original chemical abundances of the two stellar components are assumed to be typical of the SMC, with metallicity 1/5th to 1/10th of solar levels. In its current evolved state, the WR component shows dramatically different abundances, with hydrogen less than 20% at the surface, nitrogen almost undetectable, significant carbon enrichment, and most of the rest helium. This is unlike galactic and LMC WN stars which are almost entirely lacking hydrogen. It is a core helium burning star while the O type companion is still a core hydrogen burning star.

In both the primary and secondary star, their cores will eventually collapse, resulting in a supernova explosion. The initially-more massive primary will collapse first, probably as a type Ic supernova, within a few hundred thousand years. The secondary will live on as a single star, or possibly in a binary with a supernova remnant, for a few million years before it also explodes as a supernova, probably a type Ib. Massive stars at SMC metallicity may produce a low luminosity supernova, or even collapse directly to a black hole without a visible explosion.

== See also ==
- Bubble Nebula (NGC 6822)
- Bubble Nebula (NGC 7635)
- Large Magellanic Cloud
