= LH 41-1042 =

Wolf Rayet star in the constellation Dorado

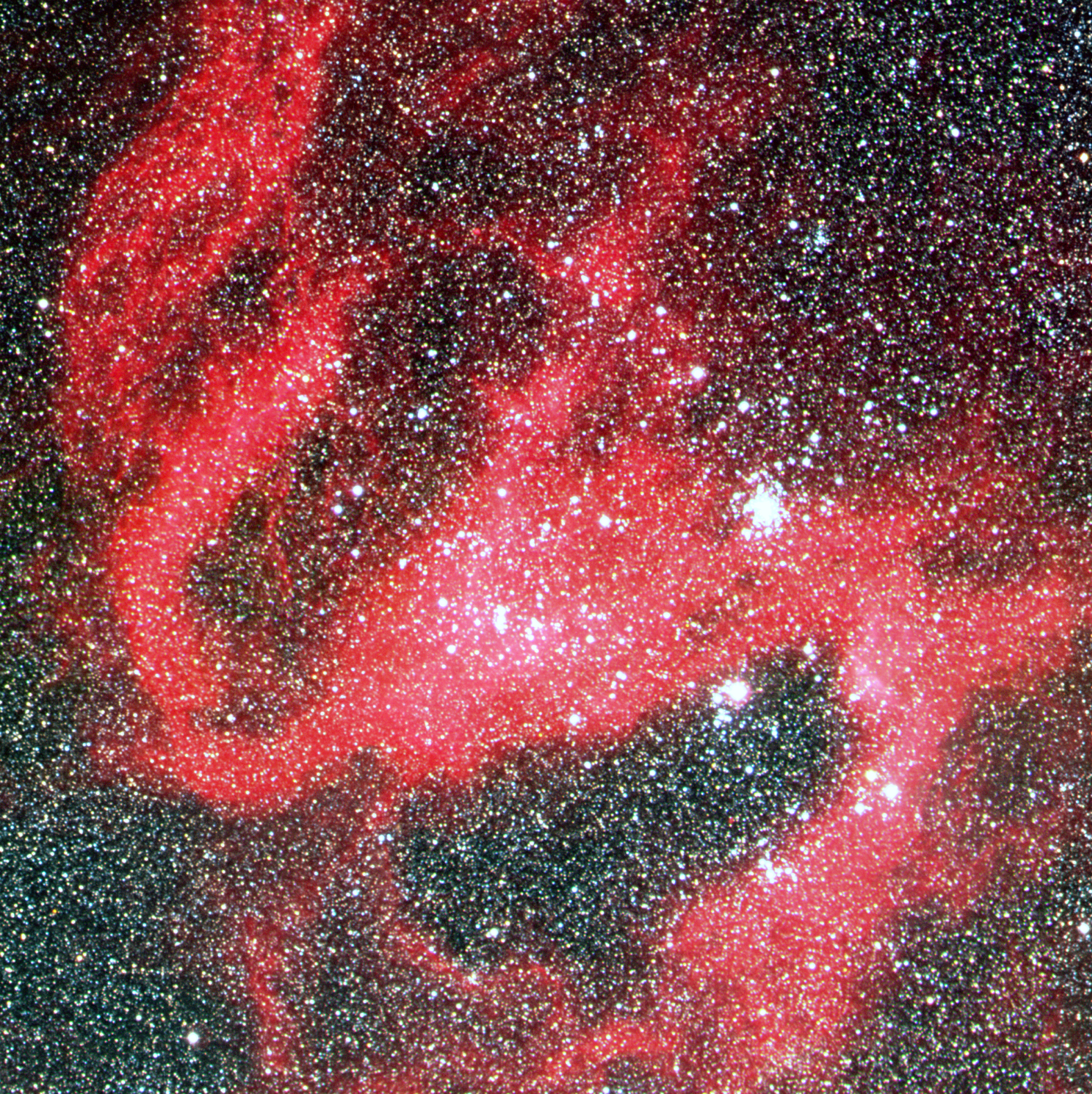
- The N119 H II regions. LH 41-1042 and LMC195-1 are both in the central core of the dense cluster to the right of centre. Credit: ESO

Observation data Epoch J2000.0 Equinox J2000.0
- Constellation: Dorado
- Right ascension: +05^{h} 18^{m} 11.01^{s}
- Declination: −69° 13′ 11.3″
- Apparent magnitude (V): 13.95

Characteristics
- Evolutionary stage: Wolf–Rayet
- Spectral type: WO4
- U−B color index: −1.38
- B−V color index: +0.31

Astrometry
| Distance | 160,000 ly (49,000 pc) |

Details
| Mass | 8.4 M_{☉} |
| Radius | 0.62 R_{☉} |
| Luminosity | 182,000 L_{☉} |
| Temperature | 150,000 K |

Other designations
- LH 41-1042

Database references
| SIMBAD | data |

LH 41-1042 is a Wolf–Rayet star located in the Large Magellanic Cloud (LMC). It is an extremely rare member of the WO oxygen sequence, the second to be discovered in the LMC and one of only three found so far in that galaxy.

The star was identified in 2012 during an investigation of the LH41 stellar association, also known as NGC 1910, using one of the 6.5m Magellan Telescopes at Las Campanas Observatory in Chile.

LH 41-1042 is located in the rich LH 41 (NGC 1910) stellar association that contains two luminous blue variables, S Doradus and R85, the WN5 star BAT99-27, and another WO star LMC195-1. The two WO stars are only 9" apart. WO stars are classified on the basis of O_{VI} emission at 381.1-383.4 nm, which is weak or absent in other Wolf–Rayet stars. The WO4 subclass is defined as having the ratio of O_{VI} to O_{V} emission strength between 0.5 and 1.8. In the new star, the ratio of these line strengths was 0.7.

The high temperature and high luminosity of LH 41-1042 produce a stellar wind travelling at 3,500 km/s and it is losing mass about a billion times more quickly than the sun. It is estimated that it has exhausted its core helium and only has 9,000 years left before it explodes as a type Ic supernova.

== See also ==
- List of most massive stars
- List of most luminous stars
