= N119 =

Spiral shaped H II region in the constellation Dorado

Emission nebula
- H II region
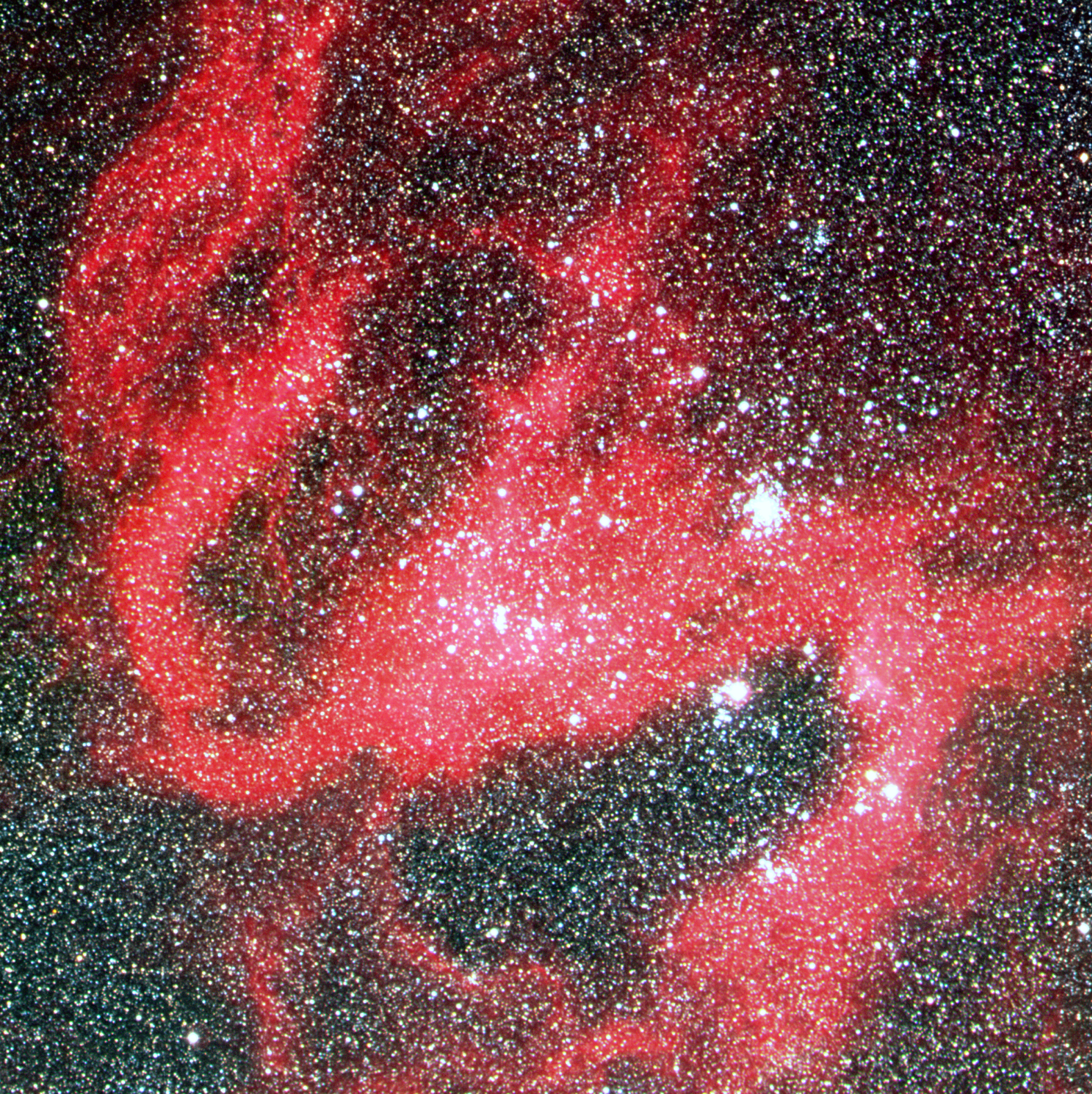
- MPG/ESO telescope Wide Field Imager blue, green, and H-alpha image of N119

Observation data: J2000.0 epoch
- Subtype: Emission nebula
- Right ascension: 5^{h} 18^{m} 45^{s}
- Declination: −69° 14′ 03″
- Distance: 160,000 ly (50,000 pc)
- Apparent magnitude (V): 5.60
- Apparent dimensions (V): 9′ 14″ × 12′ 15″ (Note: Calculated based on size and distance)
- Constellation: Dorado

Physical characteristics
- Absolute magnitude (V): −13 (10^{40.7} erg/s)
- Dimensions: 131 × 175 pc (430 × 570 ly)
- Notable features: Unusual shape
- Designations: N119, DEM L132, PKS 0518-692, LHA 120-N 119

N119 (formally known as LHA 120-N 119) is a spiral-shaped H II region in the Large Magellanic Cloud. Its dimensions are large, at 131 x 175 pc (430 × 570 ly). It contains several luminous stars including S Doradus, LH41-1042, and LMC195-1. Its peculiar S-shaped structure is difficult to explain with classical models.

== Location ==
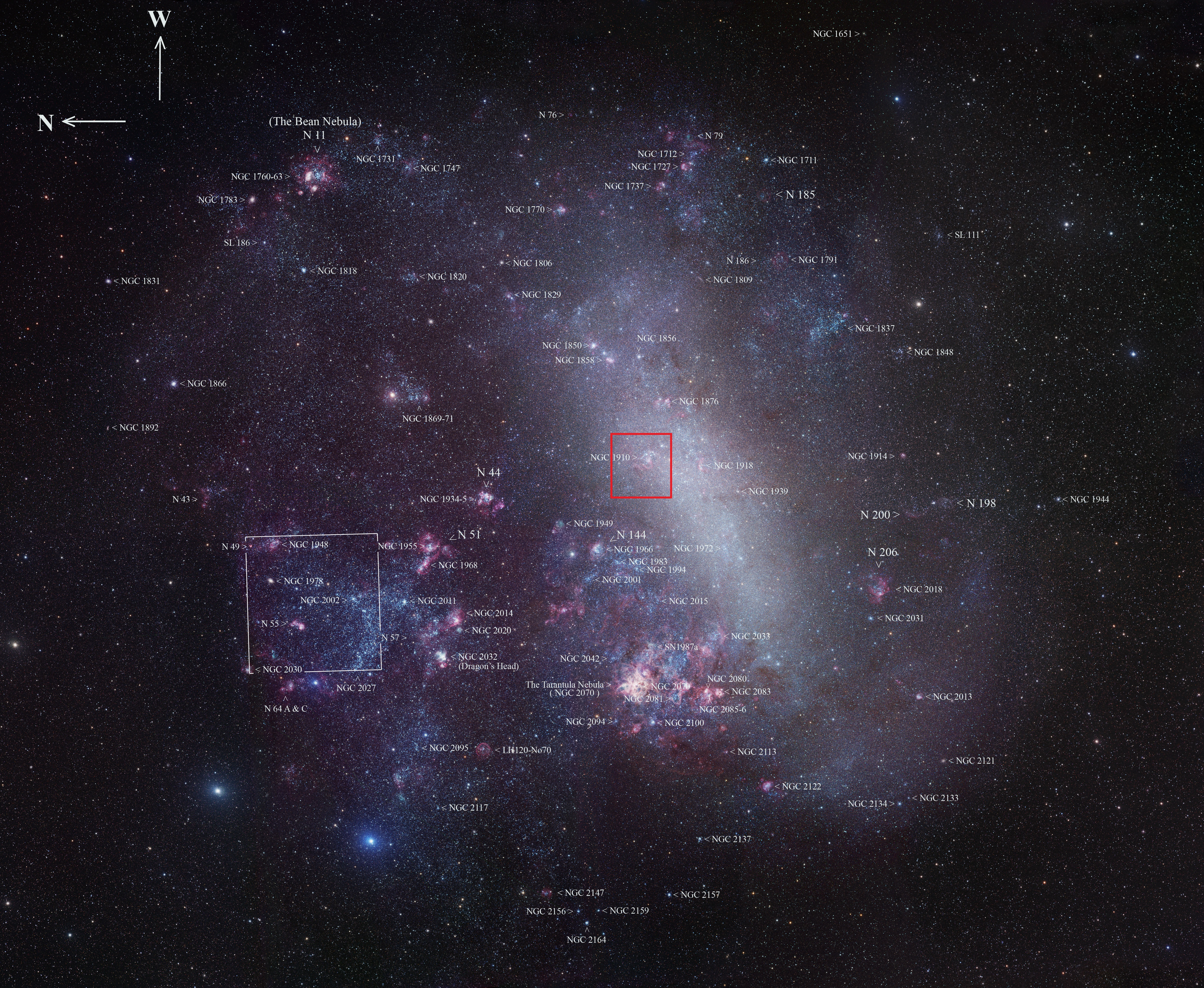
N119's location within the Large Magellanic Cloud

With a right ascension of 5^{h} 18^{m} 45^{s} and a declination of −69° 14′ 03″, this nebula may be found in the constellation of Dorado about 160 kly (50 kpc) away. Its apparent size is roughly 9′ 14″ × 12′ 15″. It lies at the northern side of the Large Magellanic Cloud's stellar bar, 15′ southeast of the center of rotation of the galaxy's neutral hydrogen.

== Structure ==
The nebula seems to be in an S-shape, but on closer inspection reveals to have extensions of the spiral arms, ending in a figure 8. The unusual shape may be due to the combination of other nebula, or it may have been formed by perforation of the original molecular cloud by powerful stellar winds and explosions.

It may have also formed by a collision of two interstellar clouds, according to Annie Laval and Patricia Ambrocio-Cruz. The gas would have been compressed, forming the luminous stars seen today.

=== Bubbles ===
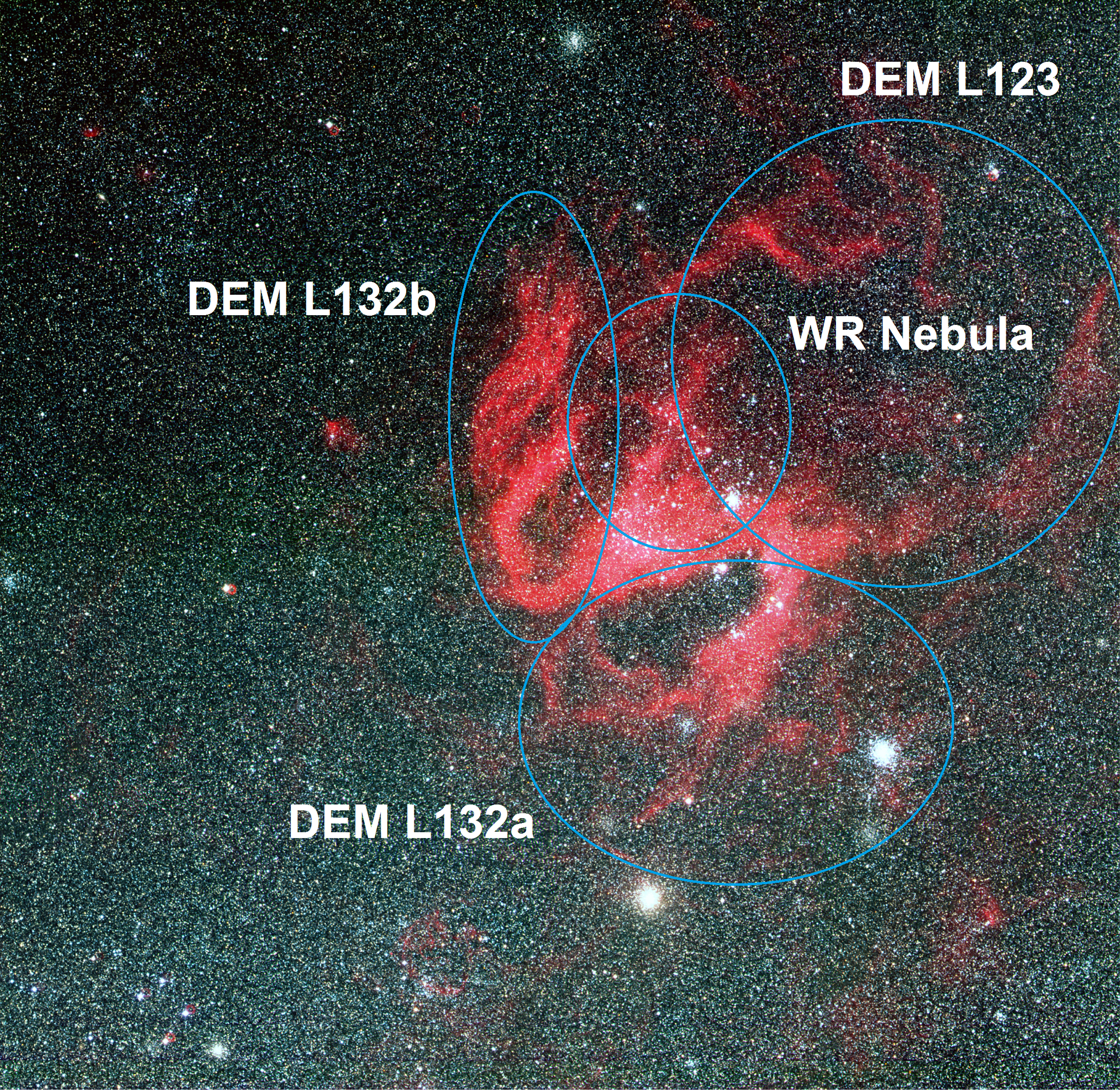
The N119 nebula with the approximate location of the bubbles marked

N119 contains several bubble-shaped nebulae: DEM L132a; DEM L132b; DEM L123; and an unnamed WR nebula. In total the nebulosity of N119 spans 131 by 175 parsecs (430 ly × 570 ly).

DEM L132a is 88 parsecs across and encompasses the two luminous blue variables S Doradus and R85. However, those stars do not emit sufficient ionising radiation to produce the observed shell, and no other hot luminous stars are seen within the shell. It may have been produced by one or both of the LBVs during an earlier phase of their evolution. DEM L132b is 52 parsecs wide and surrounds two class O giants or supergiants and numerous other hot stars, which comfortably produce the necessary ionising radiation and fast winds to sculpt the bubble from the surrounding interstellar material. The WR bubble nebula is a similar size to DEM L132b and is produced by Brey 21, a binary containing a WN3 star and a B-type supergiant. DEM L123 is 158 parsecs across and its origins are unclear. No sufficiently powerful stars have been detected inside it that could produce it with their stellar wind (as this would require the power of 44 O6 supergiants) and it is ten times too energetic to have originated from a typical supernova. This bubble may have been created by a hypernova.

Bubble Name	Exciting Star	RA of Star	Declination of Star	Spectral Type of Star	Radius of Bubble
WR Nebula	Br 21	05^{h} 18^{m} 19.3^{s}	−69° 11′ 41″	WN3	26 pc (84.8 ly)
DEM L123	SNR?	-	-	-	79 pc (257.6 ly)
DEM L132a	S Doradus	05^{h} 18^{m} 14.4^{s}	−69° 15′ 01″	LBV	44 pc (143.5 ly)
	R85	05^{h} 17^{m} 56.1^{s}	−69° 16′ 03″	LBV	
DEM L132b	Sk−69°104 (HDE 269357)	05^{h} 18^{m} 59.5^{s}	−69° 12′ 55″	O7 III	26 pc (84.8 ly)
	LH 41-32	05^{h} 19^{m} 1.9^{s}	−69° 13′ 07″	O4 III	

== Observational history ==
N119 was first catalogued by Karl Henize, an American Astronomer, when he made a list of H_{α} emission-line stars and nebulae in 1956. The full designation is LHA 120-N 119: the 119th nebula on Lamont–Hussey Observatory H-alpha (Lamont–Hussey Alpha) plate 120. Plate 120 covered the Large Magellanic Cloud while plate 115 covered the Small Magellanic Cloud. LHA 120-S 119 is a Wolf–Rayet star in another part of the LMC. There is no LHA 115-N 119 since fewer nebulae were found on the SMC plate.

On March 25–26, 1999, The Wide Field Imager, a 67-million pixel digital camera at the MPG/ESO 2.2-m telescope at the La Silla Observatory, took a picture of the nebula with a field of view of 31.49 x 30.64 arcminutes at a RA of 5^{h} 18^{m} 37.89^{s} and a declination of −69° 24′ 23.27″, and orientation of north being 1.9° right of vertical. It did four exposures each in the B band (2 minutes each), the V band (2 minutes each), and the H_{α} band (20 minutes each). It is available for download on ESO's website at 2,303 × 2,241 pixels.

== Luminosity ==
N119 suffers from 0.20 magnitudes of extinction in the B (blue) band, 0.15 in the V (yellow-green) band, and 0.12 in the H_{α} (red) band.

== NGC 1910 ==
N119 has an associated open cluster called NGC 1910 (also known as ESO 56-SC99). Its apparent magnitude is 11.2 and its apparent size is 1.54 arcminutes. It is inside N119 with a right ascension of 5^{h} 18^{m} 42.5^{s} and a declination of −69° 14′ 12.1″.
