= R85 (disambiguation) =

R85 is a candidate luminous blue variable star.

R85 may also refer to:

- HMS Cambrian (R85), a destroyer of the Royal Navy
- R-85 Munich/Neubiberg, a former airfield of the United States Army Air Forces in Germany
