= Wolf–Rayet =

Wolf–Rayet (WR) can mean:

- Wolf–Rayet star, a type of evolved, massive star
- Wolf–Rayet galaxy, which contains large numbers of Wolf–Rayet stars
- Wolf–Rayet nebula, which surrounds a Wolf–Rayet star
