= LMC195-1 =

Wolf–Rayet star in the constellation Dorado

LMC195–1
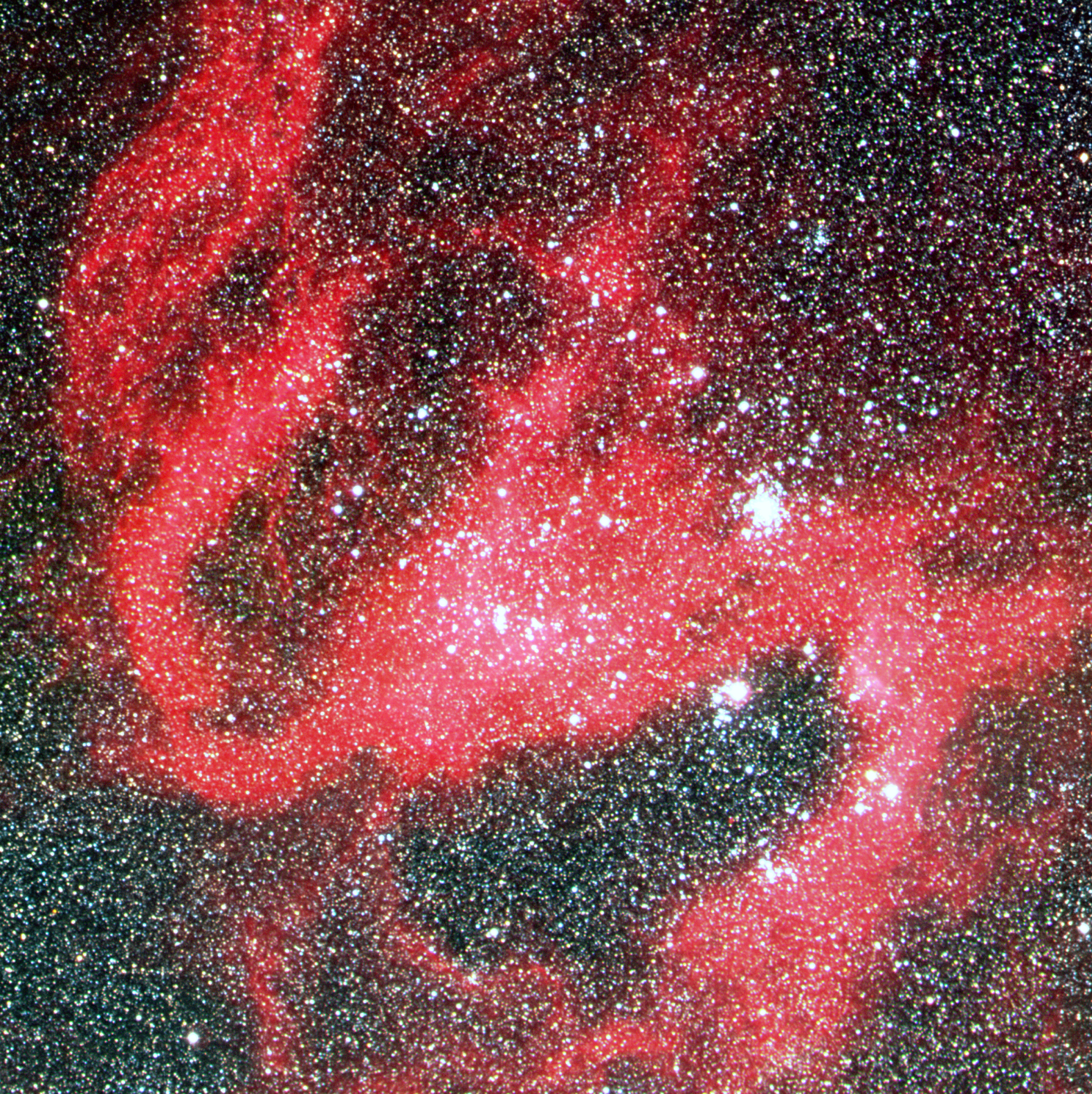
- The N119 Hii region. LMC195-1 and LH41-1042 are both in the central core of the dense cluster to the right of centre. Credit: ESO

Observation data Epoch J2000.0 Equinox J2000.0
- Constellation: Dorado
- Right ascension: +05^{h} 18^{m} 10.33^{s}
- Declination: −69° 13′ 02.5″
- Apparent magnitude (V): 15.15

Characteristics
- Evolutionary stage: Wolf Rayet
- Spectral type: WO2
- B−V color index: +0.02

Astrometry
Proper motion (μ)	RA: 1.4666 mas/yr Dec.: −0.557 mas/yr
Parallax (π)	−0.1063±0.0749 mas
Distance	160,000 ly (49,000 pc)
Absolute magnitude (M_{V})	−4.1

Details
Radius	1.4 R_{☉}
Luminosity	257,000 L_{☉}
Surface gravity (log g)	5,15 cgs
Temperature	200,000 K
Metallicity	0,008 (Aadland et al. 2022)
Age	3.5 ± 0.5 Myr

Other designations
- LMC195-1, IRSF J05181033-6913025

Database references
SIMBAD	data

LMC195-1 is a Wolf–Rayet star located in the Large Magellanic Cloud (LMC). It is an extremely rare member of the WO oxygen sequence, at WO2 the hottest known in the LMC. It is likely to be one of the hottest stars known.

The star was first observed in a 2013 survey of the Magellanic Clouds using the 1 m Swope telescope at Las Campanas Observatory in Chile. The survey was intended to identify Wolf–Rayet candidate stars by taking images through narrow-bandwidth filters centred on the 465.0 nm C_{III} and 468.6 nm He_{II} spectral lines together with a continuum filter at 475.0 nm. Digital subtraction of the separate images was used to highlight stars with particularly strong emission at one or both of the indicative spectral lines.

The first survey of the Large Magellanic Cloud in October 2013 identified eight previously unknown candidate objects, of which five were later confirmed to be Wolf–Rayet stars. LMC195-1 is located in the rich LH-41 (NGC 1910) stellar association that contains the luminous blue variable S Doradus as well as another WO star LH 41-1042. The two WO stars are only 9" apart. WO stars are classified on the basis of O_{VI} emission at 381.1-383.4 nm, which is weak or absent in other Wolf–Rayet stars. The WO2 subclass is defined as having the ratio of O_{VI} to O_{V} emission strength between four and 12.5. Higher values would indicate WO1, while smaller values would be WO3 or WO4. In the new star, the ratio of these line strengths was 4.5.

== See also ==
- List of most massive stars
- List of most luminous stars
