= WR 31a =

Wolf Rayet star in the constellation Carina

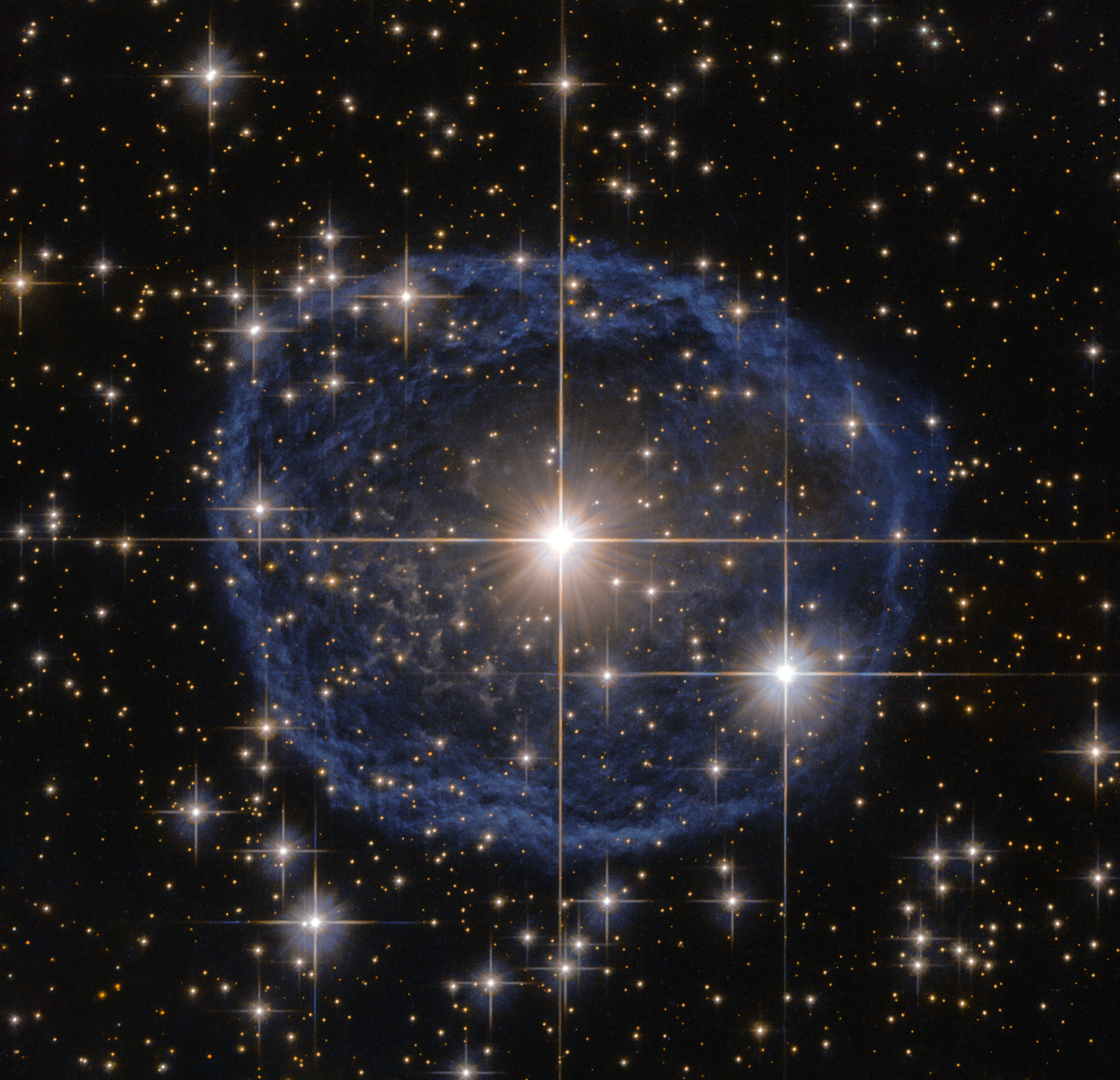
- WR 31a is surrounded by a blue bubble nebula created by a powerful stellar wind impacting material expelled during earlier stages of the star's life. Credit: ESA/Hubble & NASA; Acknowledgement: Judy Schmidt

Observation data Epoch J2000.0 Equinox ICRS
- Constellation: Carina
- Right ascension: 10^{h} 53^{m} 59.5777^{s}
- Declination: −60° 26′ 44.361″
- Apparent magnitude (V): 10.85

Characteristics
- Evolutionary stage: Wolf–Rayet
- Spectral type: WN11h
- Apparent magnitude (B): 11.64±0.10
- Apparent magnitude (V): 10.85±0.08
- Apparent magnitude (R): 10.56±0.02
- Apparent magnitude (G): 10.033±0.004
- Apparent magnitude (J): 7.323±0.024
- Apparent magnitude (H): 6.72±0.05
- Apparent magnitude (K): 6.097±0.021
- Apparent magnitude (g): 11.53±0.32
- B−V color index: 0.79
- V−R color index: 0.29
- R−I color index: 0.5
- J−H color index: 0.603
- J−K color index: 1.226
- Variable type: cLBV

Astrometry
Proper motion (μ)	RA: −5.890 mas/yr Dec.: +2.842 mas/yr
Parallax (π)	0.1152±0.0131 mas
Distance	approx. 28,000 ly (approx. 8,700 pc)
Absolute magnitude (M_{V})	−6.71

Details
Mass	17+7 −4 M_{☉}
Radius	29.8+11.9 −6.1 R_{☉}
Luminosity	1,820,000 L_{☉}
Temperature	30,200 (1985–1992) 27,500 (1991) K

Other designations
- WR 31a, Hen 3-519, He 3-519, 2MASS J10535958−6026444, GSC 08958-01166, GSC2 S1113013697, UCAC2 5308747, UCAC4 148-066854, IRAS 10520−6010, TYC 8928-1166-1, AAVSO 1050−59, MSX5C G288.9347-00.8046

Database references
SIMBAD	data

WR 31a, commonly referred to as Hen 3-519, is a Wolf–Rayet (WR) star in the southern constellation of Carina that is surrounded by an expanding Wolf–Rayet nebula. It is not a classical old stripped-envelope WR star, but a young massive star which still has some hydrogen left in its atmosphere.

== History of observations ==
WR 31a was first published in 1952 as one of six peculiar emission line stars, but not given a designation at that time. It was described as having numerous P Cygni type lines with unusually broad emission components. A year later it was listed as being associated with nebulosity, at the time thought to be a planetary nebula.

In 1976, it was included in a catalogue of southern emission-line stars, the third catalogue of emission objects compiled by Karl Gordon Henize. The designation Hen 3-519, sometimes He 3-519, was adopted as the most common identifier for this star. In 2001, it was listed in The Seventh Catalogue of Galactic Wolf-Rayet stars as entry 31a, but it is still frequently called Hen 3-519.

In 1994, WR 31a was first described as a candidate luminous blue variable (cLBV) after a detailed spectrographic study with the Anglo-Australian Telescope.

Measurements of its parallax, published in 2017 as a result of the Gaia mission, suggested a much closer (6,500 light-year; 2,000 parsec) distance to WR 31a as well as to its neighbor, the luminous blue variable AG Carinae. It was thought that, if this distance was confirmed by Gaia's second data release (DR2) in 2018, this would mean both stars were much less luminous than previously thought, and both may instead be former red supergiant stars. However, Gaia Data Release 2 returned a parallax of 0.0418±0.0299 mas; using Bayesian inference, Smith et al. (2018) calculated its distance to be 31,200+8,500
−6,000 ly (9,570+2,600
−1,850 pc). Gaia Data Release 3 lists a parallax of 0.1152±0.0156 mas, again indicating a large distance. A statistical analysis leads to a distance of 7,315+993
−935 pc.

== Blue bubble ==
WR 31a is surrounded by a shell of ionised gas nearly eight light-years (2.5 pc) wide. The Hubble Space Telescope (HST) has captured a striking image of the nebula, rendering it as a thin blue bubble. In this false colour image, the blue colours represents red visible light (605 nm), while orange-red colours represent near infrared radiation at 814 nm. Some media sources have wrongly claimed this deep-sky object was recently discovered by the HST, but this nebula was originally found by Ellen Dorrit Hoffleit in 1953 and designated as the planetary nebula Hf 39. Other planetary nebula catalogue names include ESO 128-18 and Wray 15-682.

Since 2013, the nebula has been considered not as a planetary nebula, but rather as a much larger expanding gas shell, formally classified as a Wolf–Rayet nebula or WR nebula. Its observed expansion velocity is 365 km/s (227 mi/s), and is estimated to be some 2.4 parsecs (7.8 ly) across. The dynamical age of the nebula is estimated at 18,000 years and the total mass of ionised gas at 2–3 M_{☉}.

== Properties ==
WR 31a itself, the highly luminous central star of the nebula, is invisible to the naked-eye at magnitude 10.85V. It has a spectral classification of WN11h, indicating a WR star with strong Nii emission but no Niii emission, and with hydrogen features visible in the spectrum. The spectral classification WN11 was created for this star and AG Carinae since they did not fit into any existing spectral type and appeared to constitute an extension of the WR nitrogen sequence to cooler temperatures. The progenitor's mass of the central star is estimated to have been about 45 times that of the Sun, and this massive star will likely explode as a supernova in the future.

The spectrum of WR 31a shows P Cygni profiles, most strongly on the dominant Hi, Hei, and Nii lines. These profiles may show dramatic changes on a timescale of weeks, with the absorption components of the lines sometimes disappearing completely.

== Variability ==
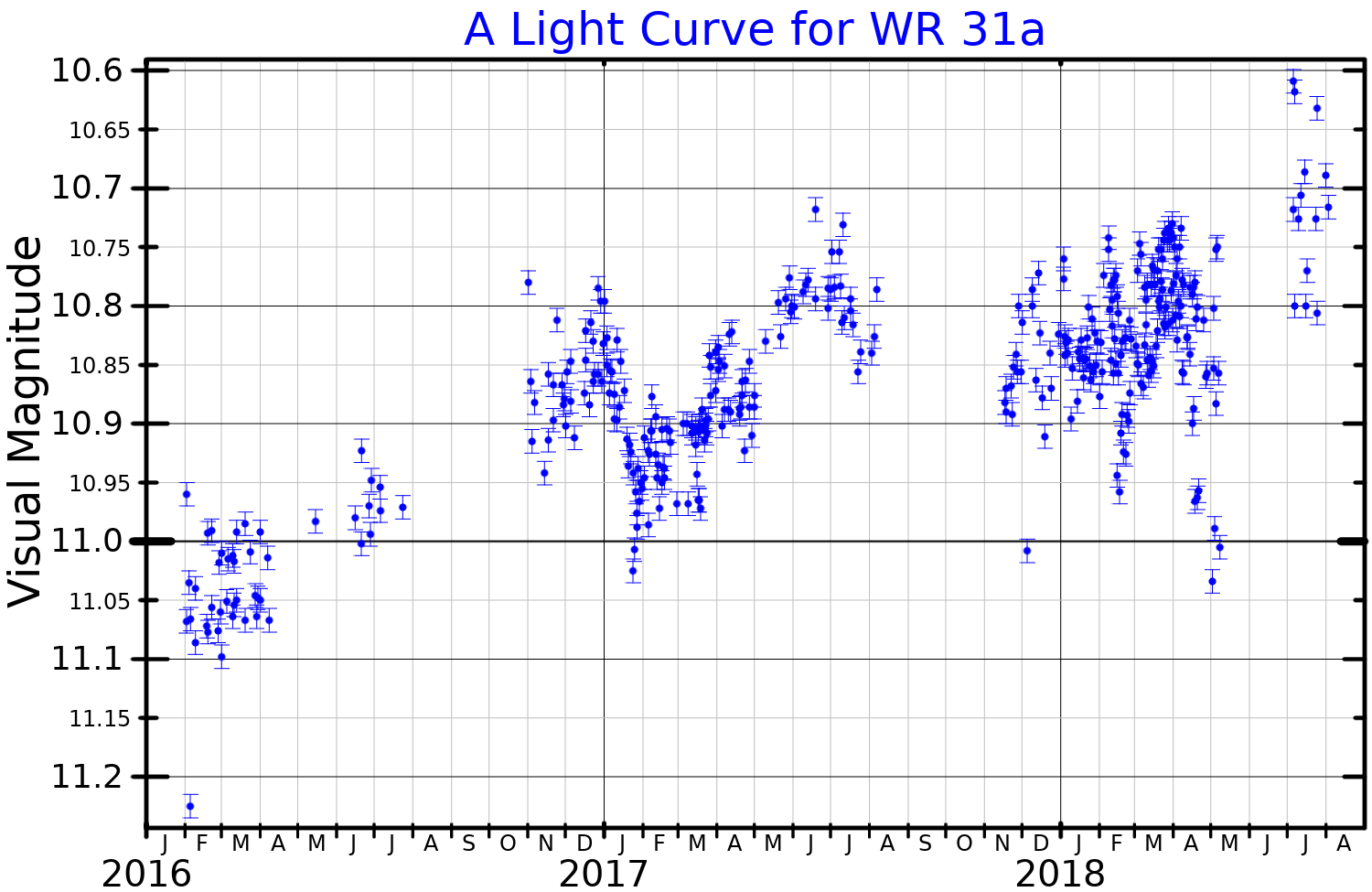
A visual band light curve for WR 31a, plotted from ASAS-SN data

No significant brightness changes have been detected in WR 31a, but it has been listed as a candidate luminous blue variable because of its luminosity, temperature, and mass loss properties. Van Genderen catalogued it as a dormant or ex-LBV because of the lack of characteristic LBV variations. Possible small brightness changes have been seen in All Sky Automated Survey (ASAS) data, WR 31a is included as a variable star in the International Variable Star Index, although not in the General Catalogue of Variable Stars.
