= Frances Woodworth Wright =

American astronomer (1897–1989)

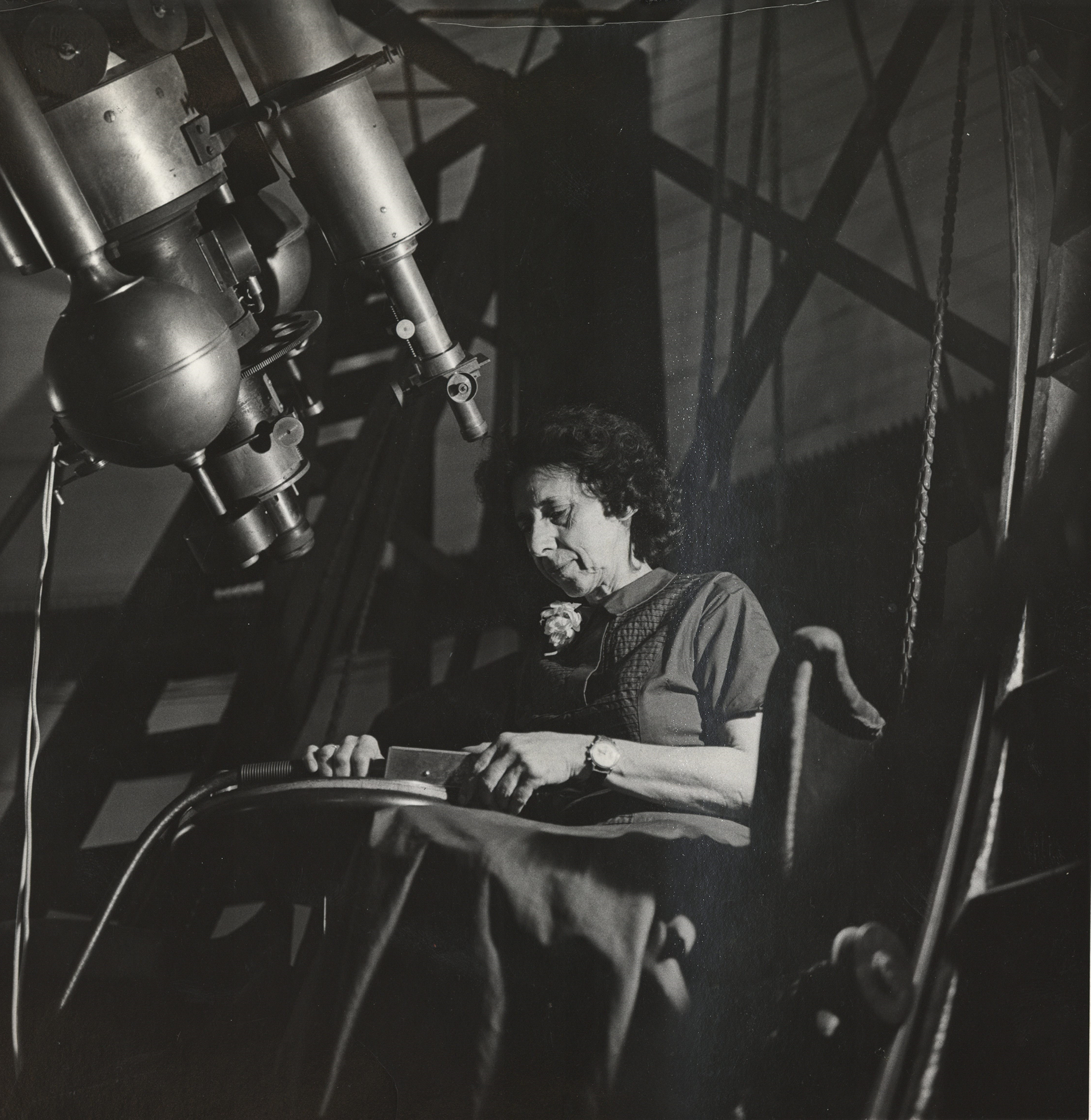
- Frances Woodworth Wright at Harvard College Observatory
- Born: April 30, 1897; Providence, Rhode Island, US
- Died: July 30, 1989 (aged 92); Cambridge, Massachusetts, US
- Known for: Celestial navigation
- Scientific career
- Fields: astronomy
- Doctoral advisor: Fred Whipple

Frances Woodworth Wright (April 30, 1897 – July 30, 1989) was an American astronomer based at Harvard University. During World War II, she taught celestial navigation to military officers and engineers.

== Early life ==
Frances Woodworth Wright was born in Providence, Rhode Island, the daughter of George William Wright and Nellie Woodworth Wright. As a child in 1907, Wright wrote a short essay titled "My Favorite Poem", for the popular national children's magazine St. Nicholas. She earned her Bachelors Degree from Pembroke College in 1919. She earned a bachelor's degree at Brown University in 1920. She was granted a Ph.D. in astronomy from Radcliffe College in 1958, as a student of Fred Whipple.

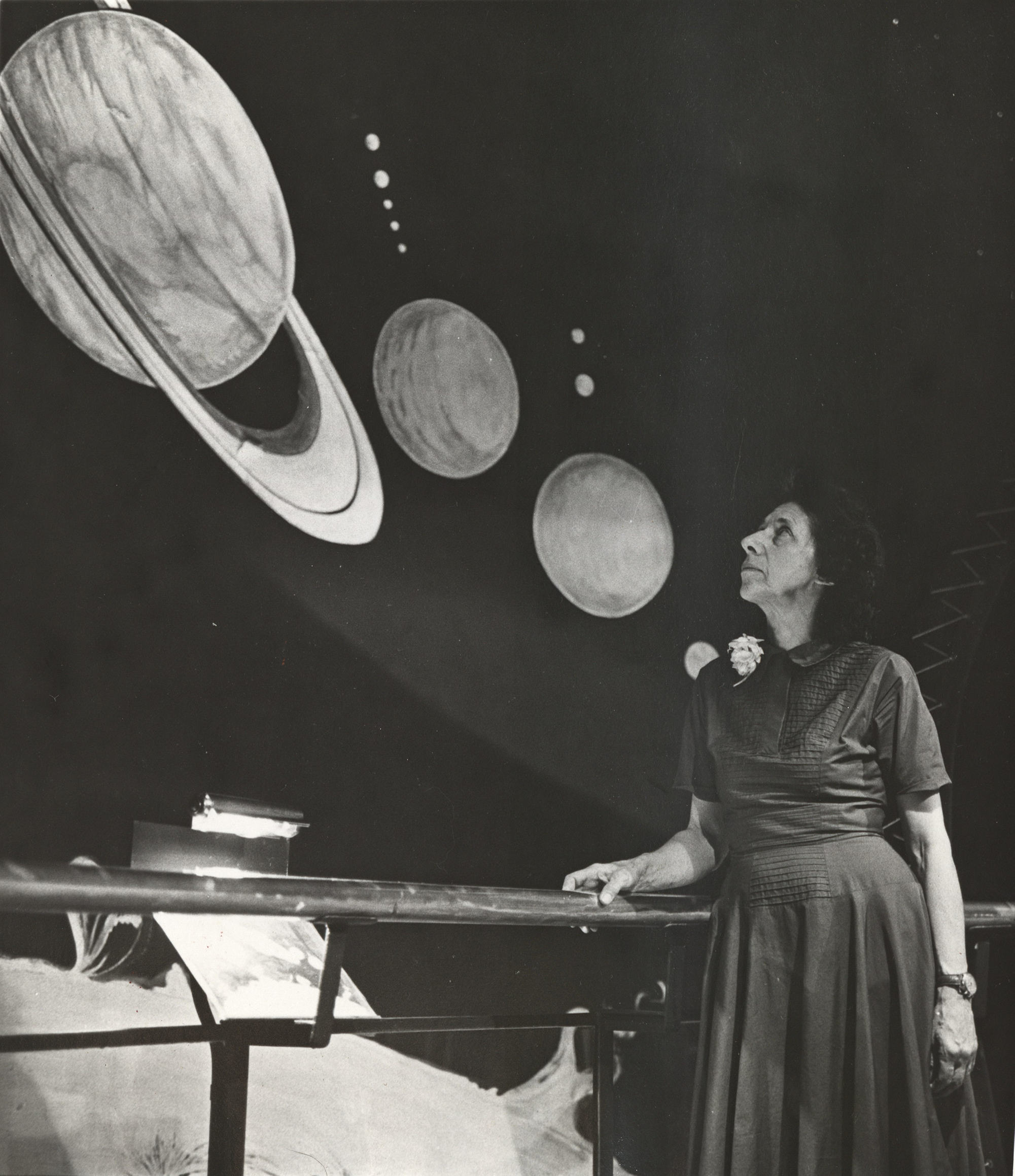
Frances Woodworth Wright examining a planetary exhibit.

== Career ==
Wright taught astronomy and mathematics at Elmira College before she was hired to be a computer at Harvard College Observatory. There she became a close friend of astronomer Cecilia Payne-Gaposchkin. The two women traveled across the United States by car together in 1930, to visit observatories in the American west, camping along the way.

During World War II, Wright taught celestial navigation to military officers and engineers; for many years afterward, she taught navigation classes to Harvard students and local sailors. "I just love the looks in some of their faces when they've learned something," she said in 1986. "You feel as if you've added to their horizons, just as it adds to mine. It inspires me to think this course gives them a sense of adventure."

She wrote three books on navigation techniques, all published by Cornell Maritime Press: Celestial Navigation (1969, revised 1982), Coastwise Navigation (1980), and Particularized Navigation: How to Prevent Navigational Emergencies (1973). She was also co-author of Basic Marine Navigation (1944, with Bart Bok) and The Large Magellanic Cloud (1967, with Paul W. Hodge). Her published research included several studies of meteoritic particles.

Wright continued working at the observatory until 1971, and taught undergraduate courses in navigation for many years after that.

== Personal life and legacy ==
She was elected as a Fellow of the American Association for the Advancement of Science in 1961. In 1976, the minor planet 2133 Franceswright was named in her honor, after its discovery at the Harvard College Observatory.

Frances Woodworth Wright died from cancer in 1989 in Cambridge, aged 92 years. Her small telescope is in the collection of historical scientific instruments at Harvard University, and Wright created and endowed the Frances W. Wright Navigation Fund, ensure the course's continued availability. A minor planet, '2133 Franceswright' discovered at the Harvard Observatory on November 20th, 1976, was named after her.
