= NGC 1910 =

Star cluster in the constellation Dorado

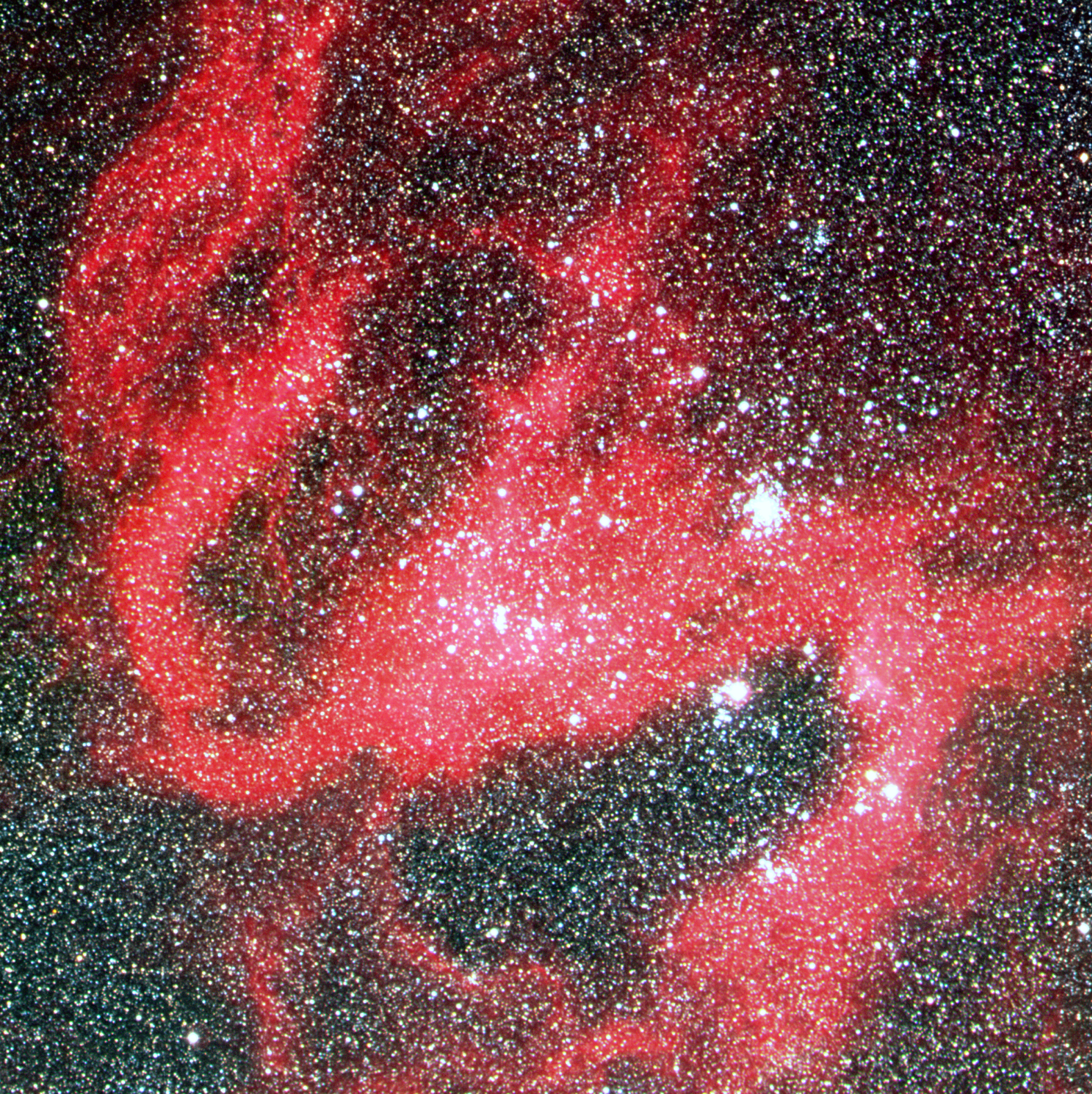
- The N119 nebula with the cluster visible. Credit: ESO

Observation data (J2000 epoch)
- Right ascension: 5^{h} 18^{m} 42.5^{s}
- Declination: −69° 14′ 12.1″
- Distance: 160,000 ly (50,000 pc)
- Apparent magnitude (V): 11.2
- Apparent dimensions (V): 1.54′ (arcmin.)

Physical characteristics
- Radius: 71.675 (21.975 pc) (Note: Calculated based on size and distance)
- Other designations: NGC 1910, ESO 56-SC99

Associations
- Constellation: Dorado

NGC 1910, or LH-41, is an OB association in the Large Magellanic Cloud.

== Location ==
NGC 1910's right ascension is 5^{h} 18^{m} 42.5^{s} and its declination is -69° 14′ 12.1″. Its angular size is 1.54 arcminutes.

== N119 ==
The cluster has an associated HII region called N119.

== Stars ==
NGC 1910 contains several stars including S Doradus, LH41-1042, LMC195-1, and R85.

== See also ==
- List of most massive stars
