= Hodge 301 =

Star cluster in the constellation Dorado

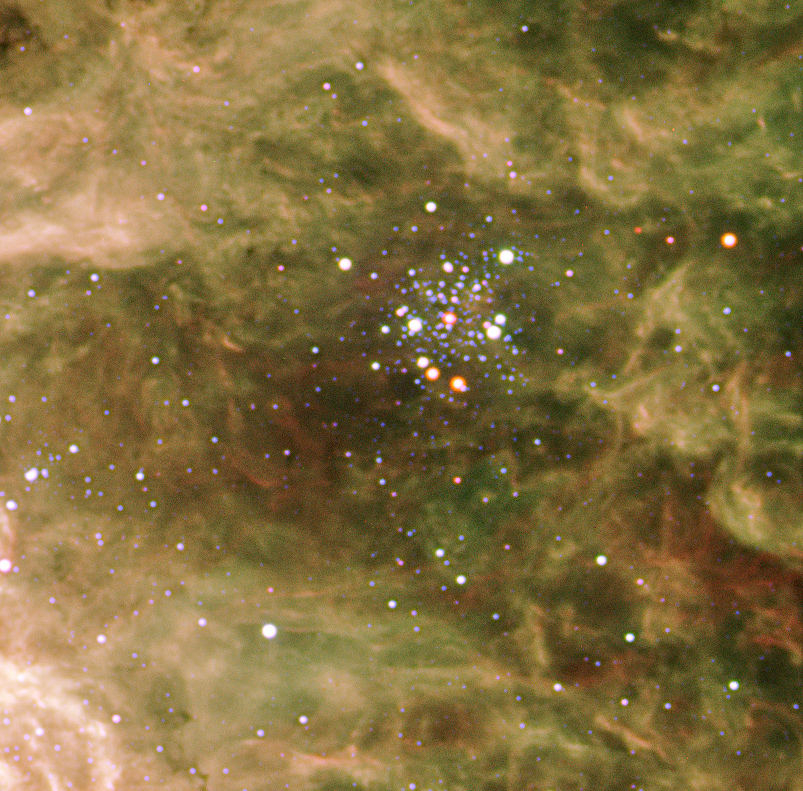
- Stellar Cluster Hodge 301; Credit: ESO

Observation data (J2000 epoch)
- Right ascension: 05^{h} 38^{m} 27^{s}
- Declination: −69° 04′ 26″
- Distance: 168 kly (51.4 kpc)
- Apparent magnitude (V): 11

Physical characteristics

Associations
- Constellation: Dorado

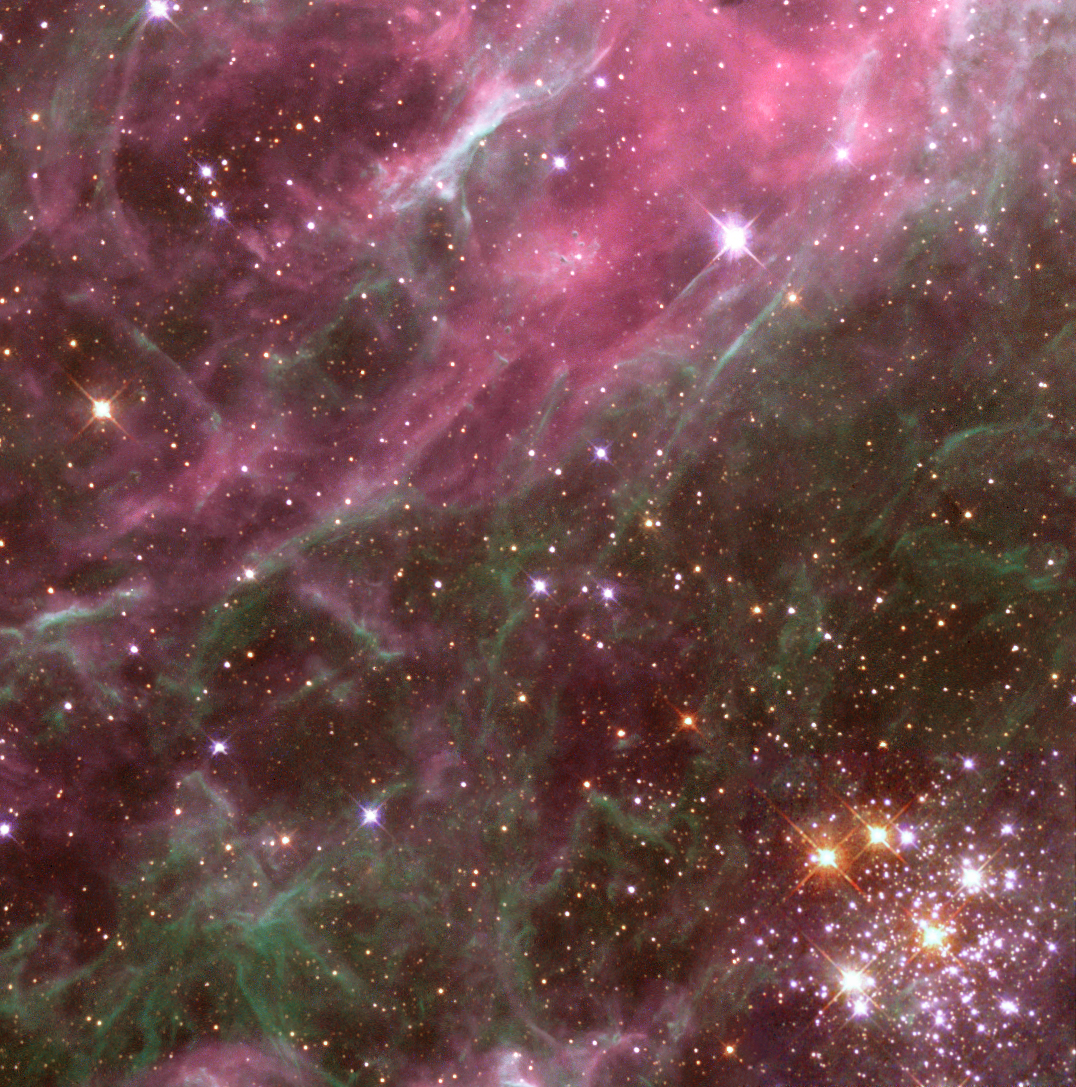
Hodge 301 (lower right) in the Tarantula Nebula

Hodge 301 is a star cluster in the Tarantula Nebula, visible from Earth's Southern Hemisphere. The cluster and nebula lie about 168,000 light years away, in one of the Milky Way's orbiting satellite galaxies, the Large Magellanic Cloud.

Hodge 301, along with the cluster R136, is one of two major star clusters situated in the Tarantula Nebula, a region which has seen intense bursts of star formation over the last few tens of millions of years. R136 is situated in the central regions of the nebula, while Hodge 301 is located about 150 light years away, to the north west as seen from Earth. Hodge 301 was formed early on in the current wave of star formation, with an age estimated at 20-25 million years old, some ten times older than R136.

Since Hodge 301 formed, it is estimated that at least 40 stars within it have exploded as supernovae, giving rise to violent gas motions within the surrounding nebula and emission of x-rays. This contrasts with the situation around R136, which is young enough that none of its stars have yet exploded as supernovae; instead, the stars of R136 are emitting fast stellar winds, which are colliding with the surrounding gases. The two clusters thus provide astronomers with a direct comparison between the impact of supernova explosions and stellar winds on surrounding gases.
