= NGC 371 =

Open cluster in the constellation Tucana

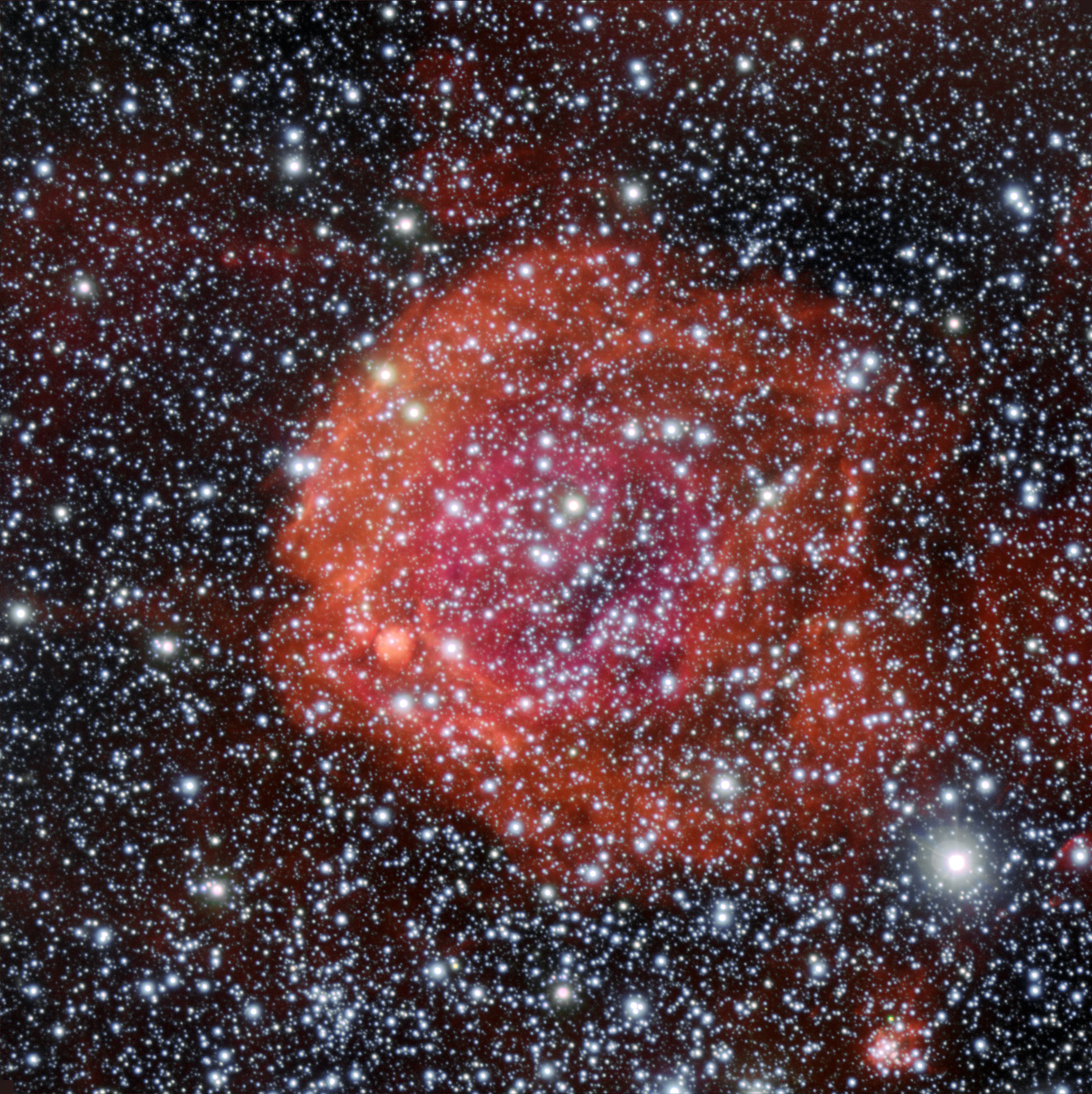
- NGC 371 image using the FORS1 instrument on ESO’s Very Large Telescope

Observation data (J2000 epoch)
- Constellation: Tucana
- Right ascension: 01^{h} 03^{m} 25^{s}
- Declination: −72° 04.4′ 00″
- Distance: 200000 ly (61320 pc)

Other designations
- Cl Kron 48, ESO 51-14, Cl Lindsay 71, Cl Melotte 5

NGC 371, also called Hodge 53, is an open cluster 200,000 light-years (61,320 pc) away located in the Small Magellanic Cloud in the constellation Tucana. It was discovered on 1 August 1826 by Scottish astronomer James Dunlop.

Prominent stars
Star name	Effective temperature (K)	Absolute magnitude	Bolometric magnitude	Mass (M_{☉})	Spectral type
AB6	105000/35000	-5.15/-6.65	-10.96/-10.01	9/41	WN4+O6.5I
AB7	105000/36000	-4.4/-5.7	-10.51/-9.01	23/44	WN4+O6I(f)
Hodge53-207	50100	-4.8	-9.3	53	O
Hodge53-47a	48600	-4.9	-9.3	50	O4V
Hodge53-47b	42400	-4.9	-8.9	37	O6.5V
Hodge53-60	37200	-5.4	-9	36	O8III
AV 327	33000	-5.8	-9.1	35	O9I
Hodge53-141	34400	-5.8	-9.2	34	O9III
Hodge53-137	35700	-5.6	-9.1	34	O8.5III
Hodge53-118	42500	-4.6	-8.6	34	
Hodge53-91	37200	-5.1	-8.7	32	O8.5V
Hodge53-11	41800	-4.4	-8.3	31	
Hodge53-74	39400	-4.6	-8.4	30	

== See also ==
- List of NGC objects (1–1000)
