= Catalogue of Spectroscopic Binary Orbits =

Compilation of star orbital data

The catalogue of spectroscopic binary orbits (SB) is a compilation of orbital data for spectroscopic binary stars which have been produced since 1969 by Alan Henry Batten of the Dominion Astrophysical Observatory and various collaborators. At the 24th International Astronomical Union general assembly, in 2000, a working group was established to take responsibility for maintenance of the catalogue, and to take it from a paper based system to an online database. The 9th catalogue was published in 2004.

As of 7 August 2009, the catalogue database contained information on over 2940 binary systems, increasing to 3722 in March 2019. The main components of the current SB9 catalogue, as a work in progress, can be downloaded in gzipped tar ball format.

== Applications ==
The catalogue is used for a variety of purposes:

- Completeness assessments and statistical analysis
- Generation of H–R diagrams and definition of shortest period
- Computation of period & eccentricity relationships
