= Paul W. Hodge =

American astronomer (1934–2019)

Paul William Hodge
- Born: November 8, 1934
- Died: November 10, 2019 (aged 85)
- Education: Yale University (BS); Harvard University (PhD)
- Known for: stellar populations of galaxies
- Children: 3
- Scientific career
- Workplaces: University of California at Berkeley; University of Washington

Paul W. Hodge (November 8, 1934 - November 10, 2019) was an American astronomer whose principal area of research was the stellar populations of galaxies.

== Career ==
Born in Seattle, Washington on November 8, 1934, Hodge grew up in the neighboring town of Snohomish. As a youth, his interests were primarily in physics, astronomy and music. He obtained a BS degree in physics at Yale University in 1956 and a PhD degree in astronomy at Harvard University in 1960. He was a National Science Foundation Post-doctoral Fellow at the Mt. Wilson and Palomar Observatories before joining the faculty of the University of California at Berkeley in 1961. He moved to the University of Washington in 1965, where he remained until 2006, and became Professor Emeritus of Astronomy. Between 1984 and 2004 he was the Editor in Chief of the Astronomical Journal.

== Research ==
Hodge was author or co-author of over 550 research papers and 28 books. He also talked at professional meetings. Most of the papers are concerned with the extragalactic universe, especially nearby galaxies, their distances and their histories. Works on the Magellanic Clouds, carried out at observatories in South Africa, Australia and Chile, included a study of young stellar associations, of which he and his students published the first catalog. With colleague Frances Woodworth Wright, he published two widely used atlases of the Magellanic Clouds. He was the first to study the structure of the Local Group dwarf galaxies and carried out the first large-scale survey of star-forming regions (HII regions) in spiral galaxies, in which he and his students mapped a total of 13011 of these objects. He and his former student, K. Krienke, discovered 652 star clusters in the Andromeda Galaxy (M31).

In the early years of his career he also did pioneering work on the collection of interplanetary dust from the upper atmosphere. With his graduate student, Donald Brownlee, he was the first to use high-altitude aircraft (e. g., B52s and U2s) to collect candidate meteoritic dust particles. Together, they also investigated meteoritic dust from deep sea sediments and from the Moon. In related research, he collected and studied meteoritic particles in the soil surrounding terrestrial meteorite craters.

A long-term mountain enthusiast, Hodge hiked extensively in the Cascade Mountains and published six books related to mountains and mountain trails. In 2001, the asteroid 14466 was named "Hodge" in his honor.

== See also ==
- Hodge 301 star cluster
- NGC 371 (Hodge 53)
