= S Doradus =

Star in the Large Magellanic Cloud

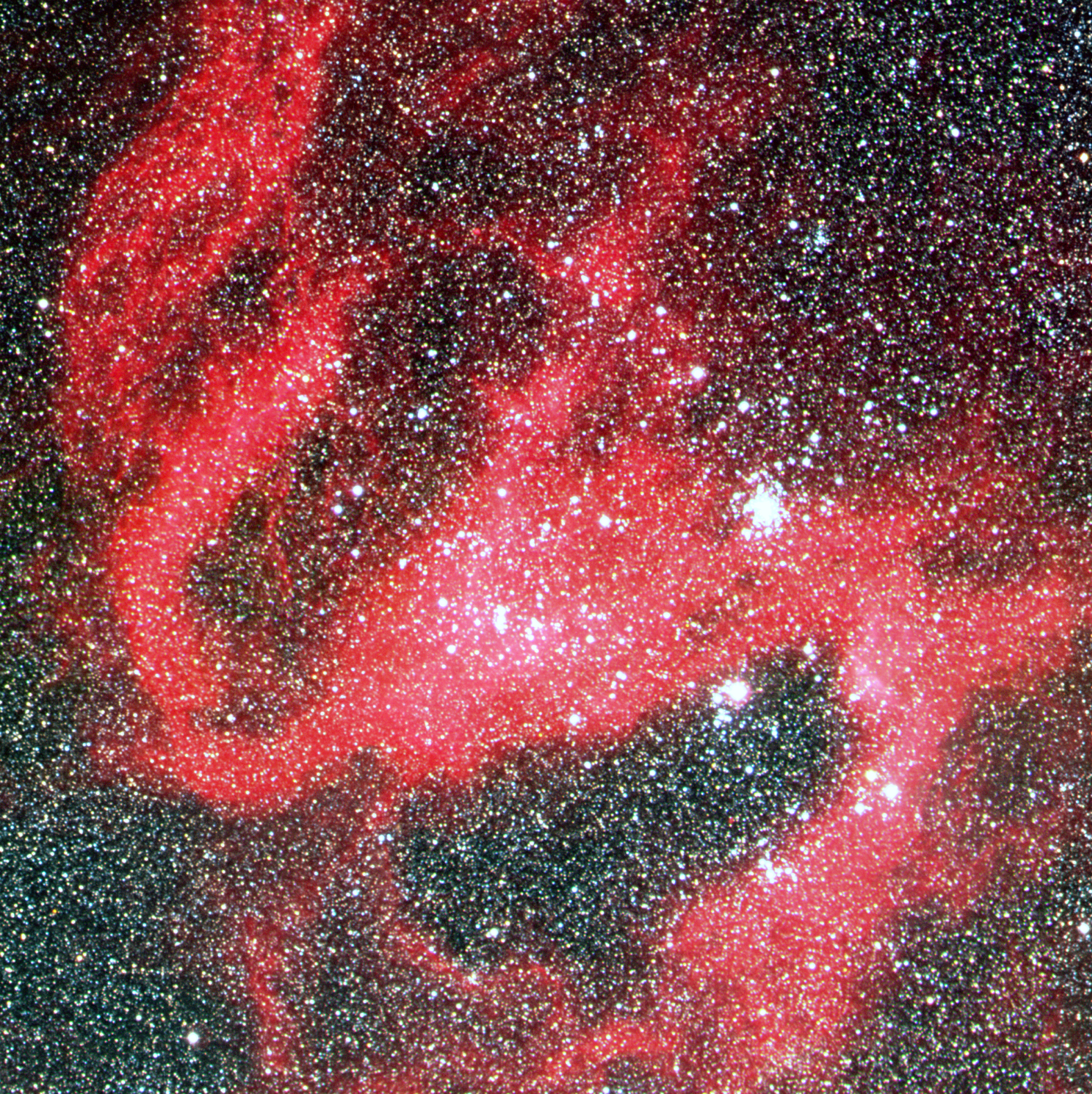
- S Doradus is the brightest individual star in NGC 1910, encircled by the lower "spiral arm". The bright star within the lower right nebulosity (N119) is R85. Credit: ESO

Observation data Epoch J2000 Equinox ICRS
- Constellation: Dorado
- Right ascension: 05^{h} 18^{m} 14.3572^{s}
- Declination: −69° 15′ 01.148″
- Apparent magnitude (V): 8.6 – 11.5

Characteristics
- Spectral type: B8/9eq – F0/5:Iae
- U−B color index: –0.98
- B−V color index: +0.11
- Variable type: S Doradus

Astrometry
Radial velocity (R_{v})	+228 km/s
Proper motion (μ)	RA: 1.735 mas/yr Dec.: 0.280 mas/yr
Parallax (π)	0.0073±0.0371 mas
Distance	169,000 ly (51,800 pc)
Absolute magnitude (M_{V})	–7.6 (1965) –10.0 (1989)

Details
Mass	24+16 −2 M_{☉}

1989 (maximum)
Radius	380 R_{☉}
Luminosity	910,000 L_{☉}
Surface gravity (log g)	0.6 cgs
Temperature	8,500 K

1985 (minimum)
Radius	100 R_{☉}
Luminosity	1,259,000 L_{☉}
Surface gravity (log g)	1.6 cgs
Temperature	20,000 K

1965 (deep minimum)
Luminosity	2,000,000 L_{☉}
Temperature	35,000 K

Other designations
- CD-69 295, HD 35343, CPD-69 356, IRAS 05182-6918, AAVSO 0518-69.

Database references
SIMBAD	data

S Doradus (also known as S Dor) is one of the brightest stars in the Large Magellanic Cloud (LMC), a satellite galaxy of the Milky Way, located roughly 160,000 light-years away. The star is a luminous blue variable, and one of the most luminous stars known, having a luminosity varying widely above and below 1,000,000 times the luminosity of the Sun, although it is too far away to be seen with the naked eye.

== History ==
S Doradus was noted in 1897 as an unusual and variable star, of Secchi type I with bright lines of H_{α}, H_{β}, and H_{γ}. The formal recognition as a variable star came the assignment of the name S Doradus in 1904 in the second supplement to Catalogue of Variable Stars.

S Dor was observed many times over the following decades. In 1924, it was described as "P Cygni class" and recorded at photographic magnitude 9.5 In 1925, its absolute magnitude was estimated at −8.9. In 1933 it was listed as a 9th-magnitude Beq star with bright hydrogen lines. It was the most luminous star known at that time.

In 1943, the variability was interpreted as being due to eclipses of a binary companion, orbiting with a period of 40 years. This was refuted in 1956, when the variability was described as irregular and the spectrum as A0 with P Cygni profiles and emission for many spectral lines. The brightness was observed to decline by 0.8 magnitude from 1954 into 1955. At the same time, S Doradus was noted as being similar to the Hubble–Sandage variables, the LBVs discovered in M31 and M33. The brief 1955 minimum was followed by a deep minimum in 1964, when the spectrum was compared to Eta Carinae in strong contrast to the mid-A spectrum at normal brightness.

By 1969 the nature of S Doradus was still uncertain, considered possibly to be a pre-main-sequence star, but during the next decade the consensus settled on the S Doradus type variables and Hubble-Sandage variables being evolved massive supergiants. They were eventually given the name "luminous blue variables" in 1984, coined in part because of the similarity of the acronym LBV to the well-defined LPV class of variable stars. The classification system defined for the General Catalogue of Variable Stars pre-dated this and so the acronym SDOR is used for LBVs.

== Surroundings ==
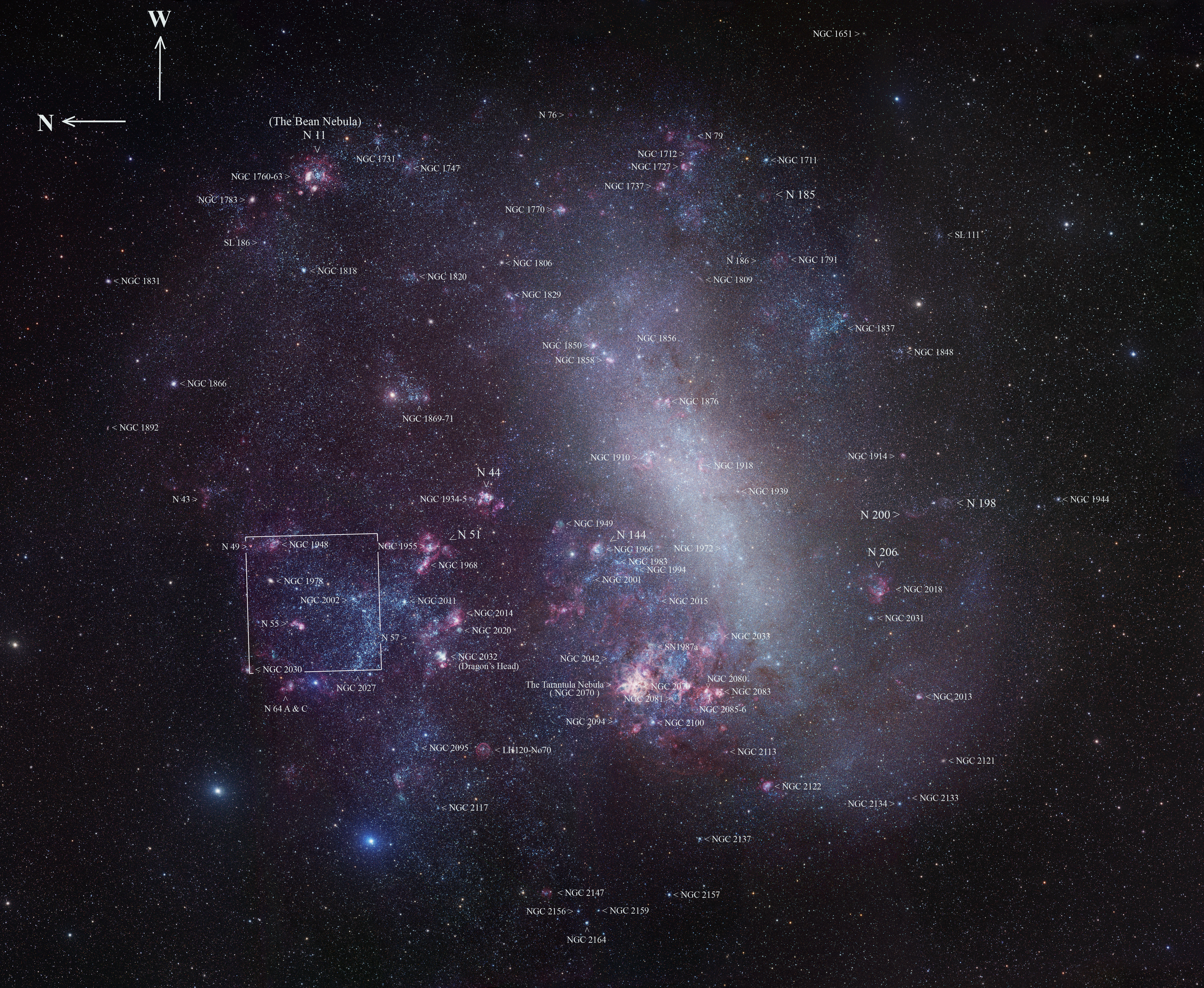
Large Magellanic Cloud. NGC 1910 is labelled near the centre of the image, and S Doradus is clearly visible at full size. (Credit: Robert Gendler/ESO)

S Doradus is the brightest member of the open cluster NGC 1910, also known as the LH41 stellar association, visible in binoculars as a bright condensation within the main bar of the LMC. This is within the N119 emission nebula, which has a distinctive spiral shape. It is one of the visually brightest individual stars in the LMC, at some times the brightest. There are only a handful of other 9th-magnitude stars in the LMC, such as the yellow hypergiant HD 33579.

There are several compact clusters near S Doradus, within the general NGC 1910/LH41 association. The closest is less than four arc-minutes away, contains two out of the three WO stars in the entire LMC, and the entire cluster is about the same brightness as S Doradus. A little further away is NGC 1916. Another LBV, R85, is just two arc-minutes away. This rich star-forming region also hosts a third Wolf–Rayet star, at least ten other supergiants, and at least ten class O stars.

S Doradus has a number of close companion stars. The Washington Double Star Catalog lists two 11th-magnitude stars 5″ away, which at the distance of the LMC is about four light years. A much closer companion has been found using the Hubble Space Telescope Fine Guidance Sensor, 1.7″ away and four magnitudes fainter. There are other nearby stars, most notably a 12th-magnitude OB supergiant at 13″.

== Variability ==
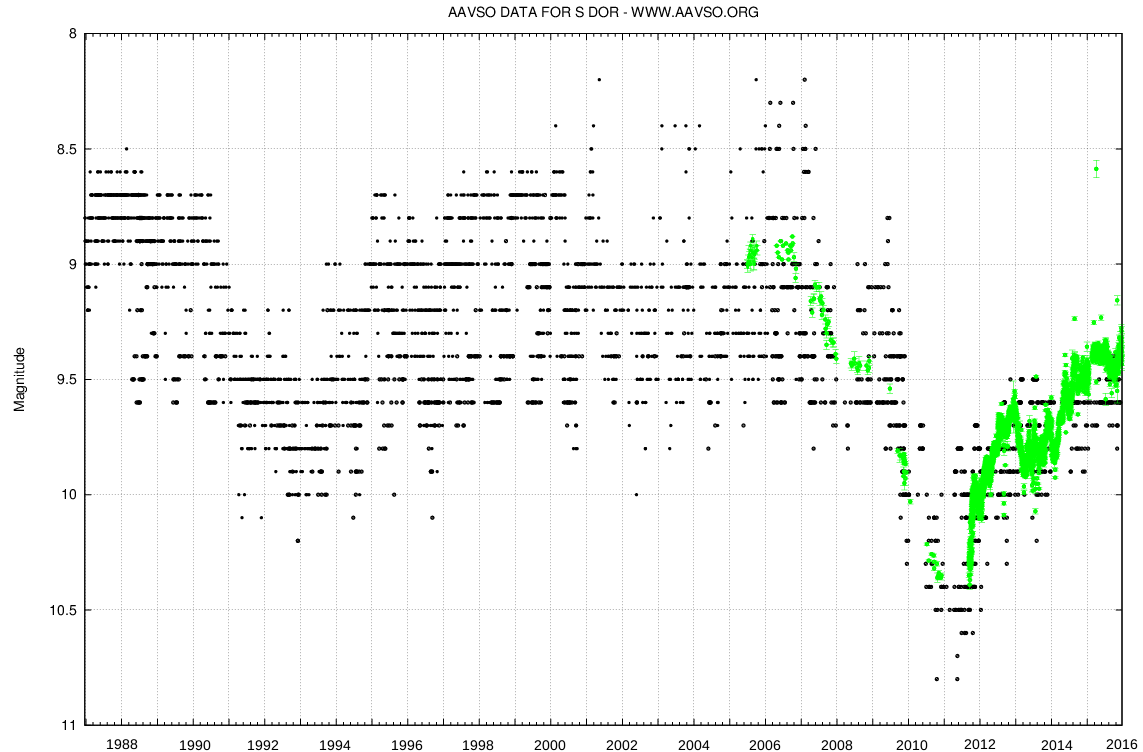
Light curve of S Doradus from 1987 to 2016, showing slow variations with a deep minimum in 2011

This star belongs to its own eponymous S Doradus class of variable stars, also designated as luminous blue variables or LBVs. LBVs exhibit long slow changes in brightness, punctuated by occasional outbursts. S Doradus is typically a magnitude 9 star, varying by a few tenths of a magnitude on timescales of a few months, superimposed on variations of about a magnitude taking several years. The extreme range of these variations is from about visual magnitude 8.6–10.4. Every few decades it shows a more dramatic decrease in brightness, to as low as magnitude 11.5. The nature of the variation is somewhat unusual for an LBV; S Doradus is typically in an outburst state, with only occasional fades to the quiescent state that is typical of most stars in the class.

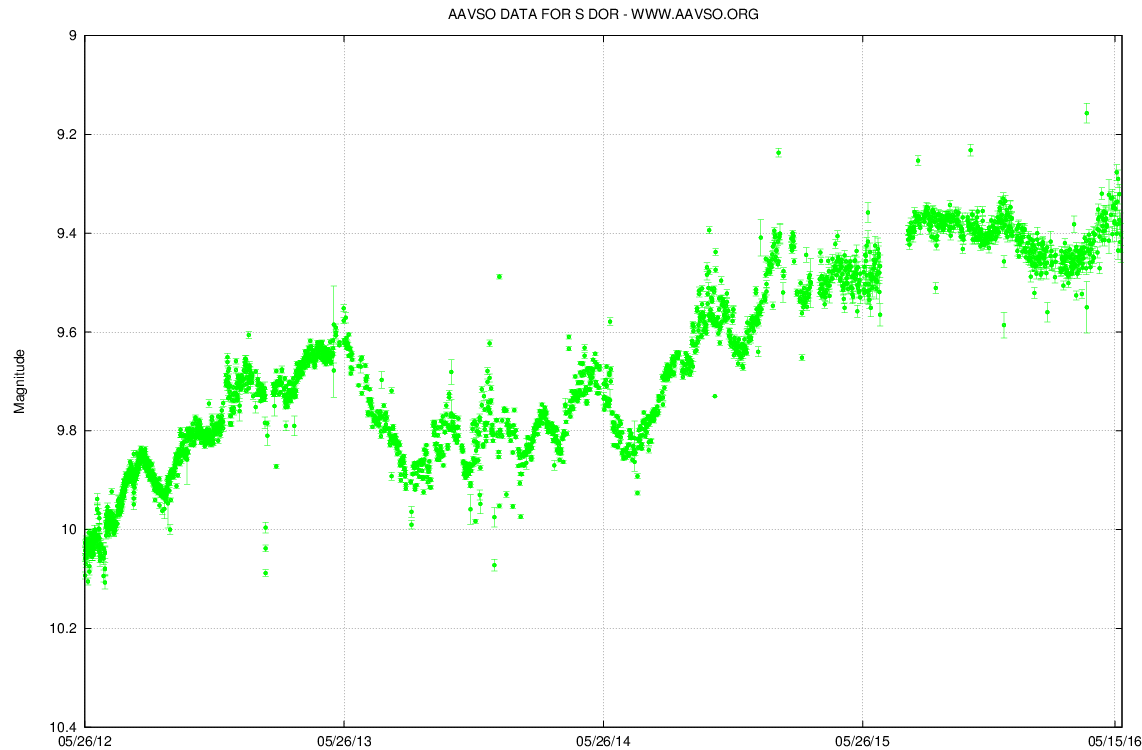
Light curve of S Doradus from 2012 to 2016, showing the microvariations superimposed on a slow rise from the deep 2011 minimum

The colour of S Doradus changes as its brightness varies, being bluest when the star is faintest. At the same time, the spectrum shows dramatic changes. It is typically an extreme mid-A supergiant with P Cygni profiles on many lines (e.g. A5eq or A2/3Ia^{+}e). At maximum brightness, the spectrum can become as cool as an F supergiant, with strong ionised metal lines and almost no emission components. At minimum brightness, the spectrum is dominated by emission, particularly forbidden lines of Feii but also helium and other metals. At the deep minima these features are even more pronounced, and Feiii emission also appears.

Attempts to identify regularity in the unpredictable changes of brightness suggest a period of around 100 days for the small amplitude variations near maximum brightness. At minimum brightness, these microvariations are considered to occur with periods as long as 195 days. The slower variations have been characterised with a period of 6.8 years, with an interval of 35–40 years between deep minima. The microvariations are similar to the brightness changes shown by α Cygni variables, which are less luminous hot supergiants.

== The instability strip ==
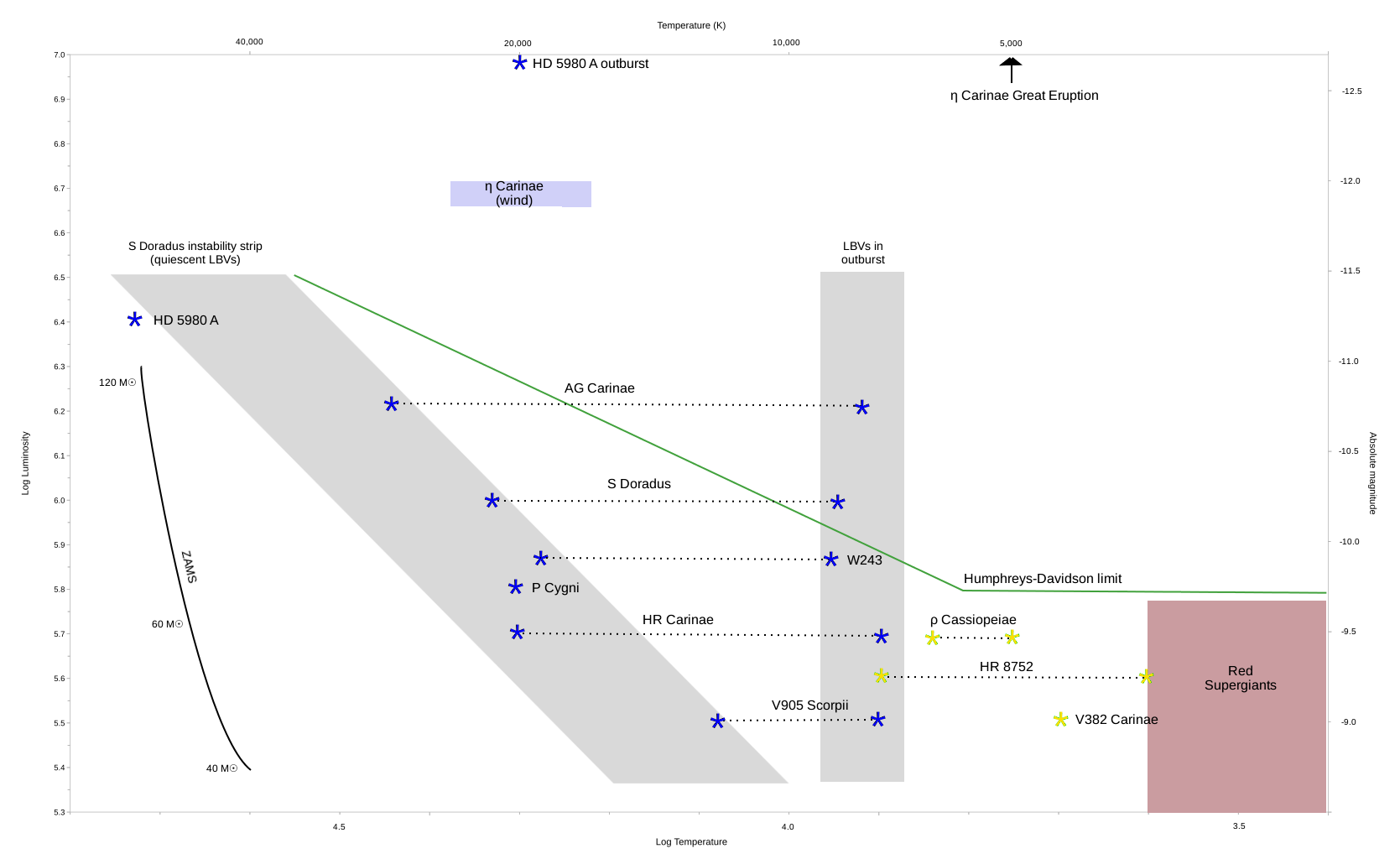
The S Doradus Instability strip and outburst region in the H–R diagram, showing S Doradus at minimum and maximum under the assumption of constant luminosity

S Doradus variables (LBVs) show distinct quiescent and outburst states. During the quiescent phase, LBVs lie along a diagonal band in the H–R diagram called the S Doradus Instability Strip, with the more luminous examples having hotter temperatures.

The standard theory is that LBV outbursts occur when the mass loss increases and an extremely dense stellar wind creates a pseudo-photosphere. The temperature drops until the wind opacity starts to decrease, meaning all LBV outbursts reach a temperature around 8,000–9,000 K. The bolometric luminosity during outbursts is considered to remain largely unchanged, but the visual luminosity increases as radiation shifts from the ultraviolet into the visual range. Detailed investigations have shown that some LBVs appear to change luminosity from minimum to maximum. S Doradus has been calculated to be less luminous at maximum brightness (minimum temperature), possibly as a result of potential energy going into expansion of a substantial portion of the star. AG Carinae and HR Carinae show similar luminosity decreases in some studies, but in the most convincing case AFGL 2298 increased its luminosity during its outbursts.

Rare larger eruptions can appear as long-lasting under-luminous supernovae, and have been termed supernova impostors. The cause of the eruptions is unknown, but the star survives and may experience multiple eruptions. Eta Carinae and P Cygni are the only known examples in the Milky Way, and S Doradus has not shown such an eruption.

== Stellar properties ==
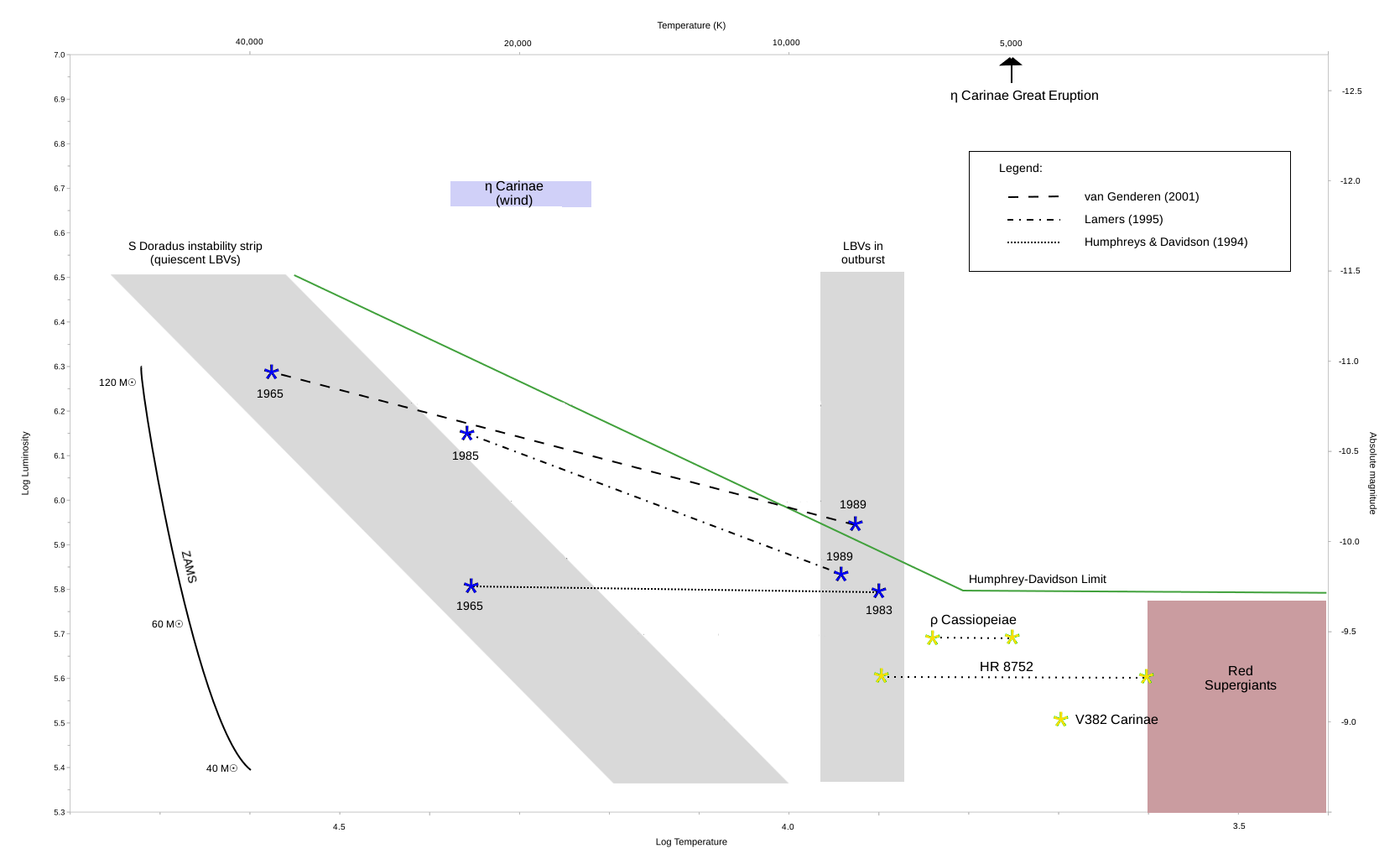
S Doradus properties at minimum and maximum according to different studies: van Genderen (2001), temperature at minimum derived from colour index; Lamers (1995), properties derived from non-LTE model atmosphere; Humphreys & Davidson (1994), temperature at minimum assumes constant luminosity

The temperature of an LBV is difficult to determine because the spectra are so peculiar and the standard colour calibrations don't apply, so the luminosity changes associated with brightness variations cannot be calculated accurately. Within the margins of error, it has often been assumed that the luminosity stays constant during all LBV outbursts. This is likely if the outburst consists only of an opaque stellar wind forming a pseudo-photosphere to mimic a larger cooler star.

Better atmospheric physics and observations of luminosity changes during some LBV outbursts have cast doubt on the original models. The atmosphere of S Doradus has been modeled in detail between a normal minimum at magnitude 10.2 in 1985 and a maximum at magnitude 9.0 in 1989. The temperature was calculated to drop from 20,000 K to 9,000 K, and the luminosity dropped from 1,259,000 L_{☉} to 794,000 L_{☉}. This corresponds to an increase in the radius of the visible surface of the star from 100 R_{☉} to 380 R_{☉}. A simpler calculation of the variation from the deep 1965 minimum at magnitude 11.5 to the 1989 maximum gives a temperature drop from 35,000 K to 8,500 K, and the luminosity drop from 2,000,000 L_{☉} to 910,000 L_{☉}. For a brief period during the maximum in late 1999, the temperature dropped further to between 7,500 K and 8,500 K, without the brightness changing noticeably. This is normal in other LBVs at maximum and is as cool as they can get, but it has not been seen in S Doradus before, or since. Observations of AG Carinae have shown that any luminosity changes between minimum and maximum may occur abruptly over a small temperature range, with the luminosity approximately constant during the rest of the light curve.

The mass of an LBV is difficult to calculate directly unless it is in a binary system. The surface gravity changes dramatically and is difficult to measure from the peculiar spectral lines, and the radius is poorly defined. LBVs are thought to be the direct predecessors of Wolf–Rayet stars, but may be either just evolved from the main sequence or post-red supergiant stars with much lower masses. In the case of S Doradus, the current mass is likely to be in the range of 20–45 M_{☉}.
