= R85 =

Candidate luminous variable star in the constellation Dorado

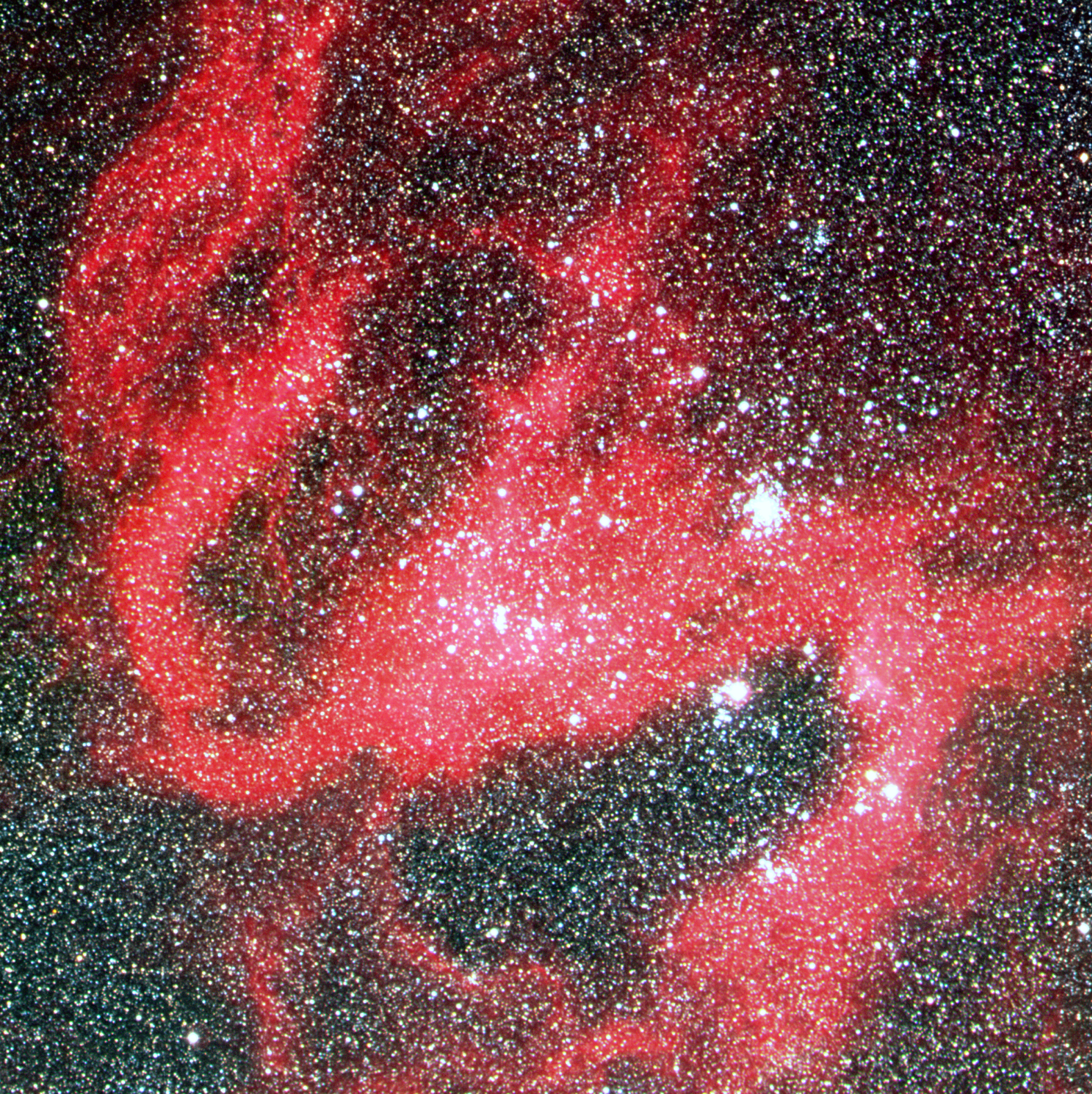
- The nebula N119; R85 is the brightest of the small triangle of stars in the lower right "arm". Credit: ESO

Observation data Epoch J2000 Equinox ICRS
- Constellation: Dorado
- Right ascension: 05^{h} 17^{m} 56.076^{s}
- Declination: −69° 16′ 03.77″
- Apparent magnitude (V): 10.84 (10.65 - 10.80)

Characteristics
- Evolutionary stage: LBV
- Spectral type: B5 Iae
- Apparent magnitude (U): 10.28
- Apparent magnitude (B): 10.93
- Apparent magnitude (V): 10.84
- Apparent magnitude (R): 10.53
- Apparent magnitude (I): 10.44
- Apparent magnitude (J): 10.103
- Apparent magnitude (H): 9.980
- Apparent magnitude (K): 9.822
- U−B color index: −0.65
- B−V color index: +0.09
- Variable type: LBV

Astrometry
Radial velocity (R_{v})	292 km/s
Proper motion (μ)	RA: −1.0 mas/yr Dec.: −2.3 mas/yr
Distance	160,000 ly (50,000 pc)
Absolute magnitude (M_{V})	−8.2 – −8.5

Details

1960 (minimum)
Radius	135 R_{☉}
Luminosity	350,000 L_{☉}
Temperature	13,500 K

1983 - 1990 (maximum)
Luminosity	315,000 L_{☉}
Temperature	10,000 K

Other designations
- HD 269321, CPD−69°352, 2MASS J05175607-6916037, GSC 09162-00359, Sk−69°92

Database references
SIMBAD	data

R85 (or RMC 85, after the Radcliffe Observatory Magellanic Clouds catalog) is a candidate luminous blue variable located in the LH-41 OB association in the Large Magellanic Cloud.

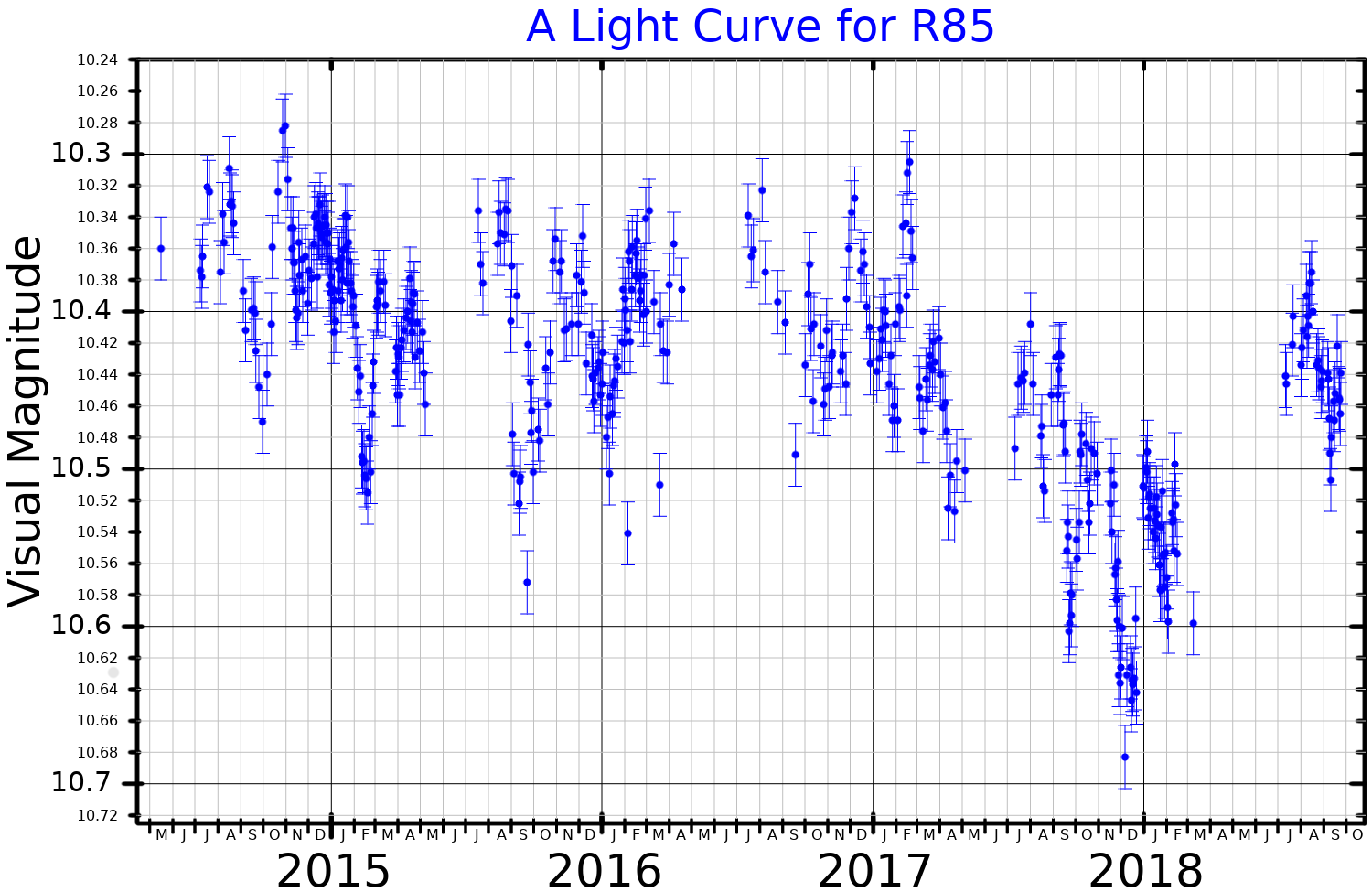
A visual band light curve for R85, plotted from ASAS-SN data

R85 has been shown to vary erratically in brightness with an amplitude of about 0.3 magnitudes. It shows variations on several timescales, sometimes with a distinct 400 day period. It has also shown temperature changes associated with brightness changes over several years, a characteristic of luminous blue variables.

Based on R85's current properties and evolutionary models, it probably started out with an initial mass of 28 M_{☉}. It is theorized to be making a bubble known as DEM L132a with its stellar wind in the nebula LHA-120 N119, along with S Doradus. It has an infrared excess consistent with a stellar wind contribution.
