= Wolf–Rayet nebula =

Nebula which surrounds a Wolf–Rayet star

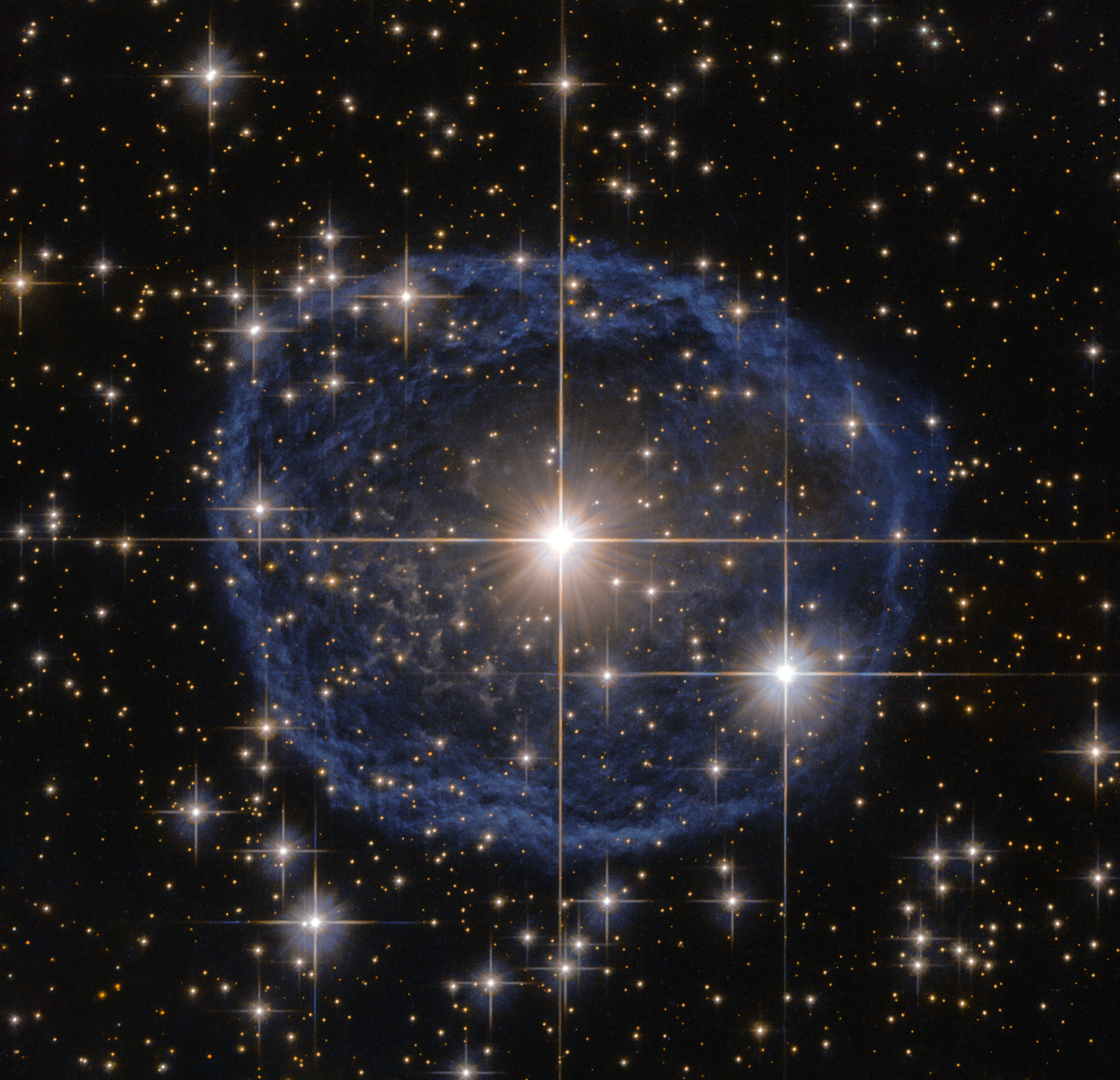
WR 31a is surrounded by a bubble nebula.

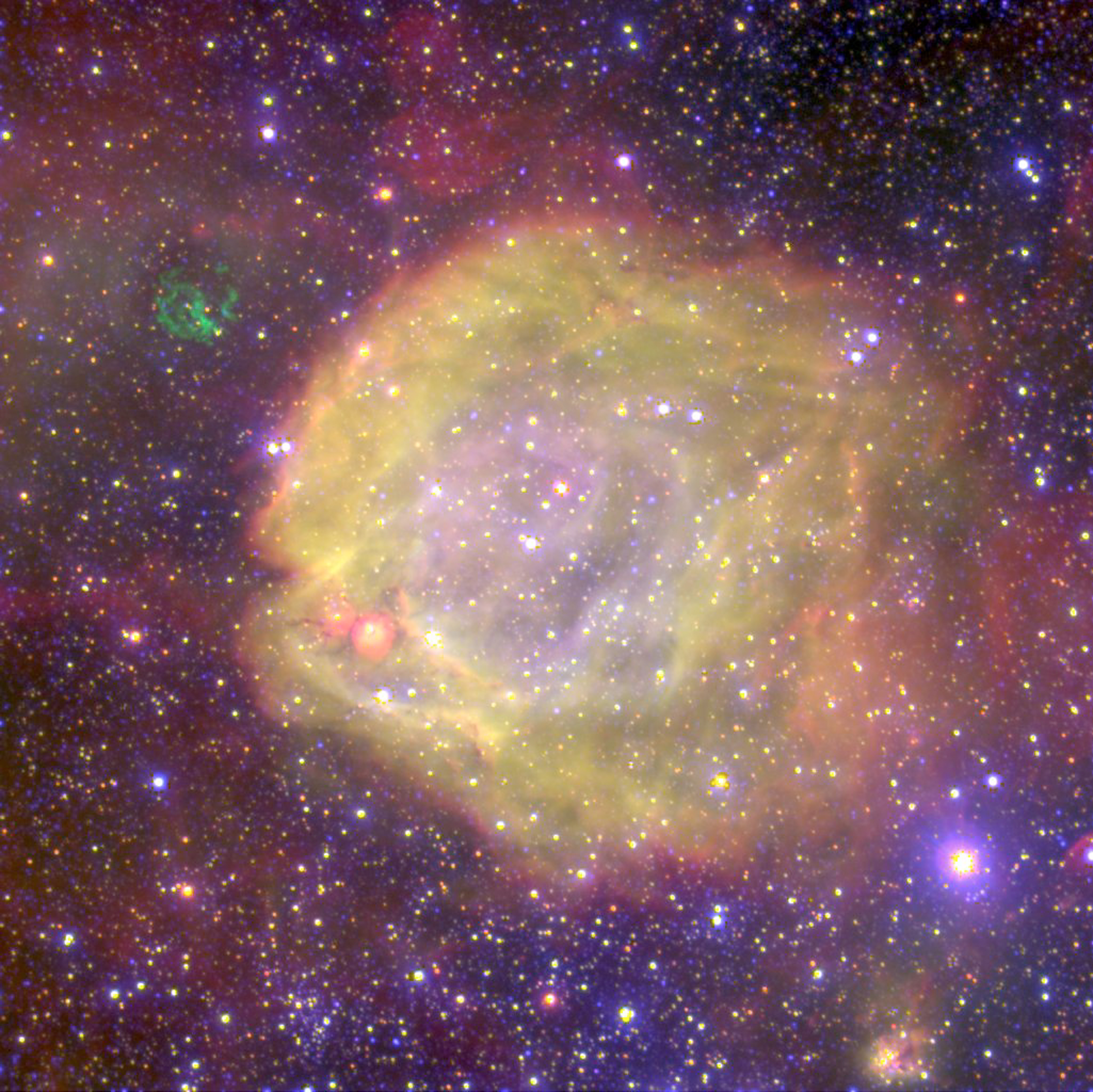
AB7 is one of the highest-excitation nebulae in the Magellanic Clouds, two satellite galaxies of the Milky Way.

A Wolf–Rayet nebula is a type of nebula created from stellar winds expelled by Wolf–Rayet stars. Wolf–Rayet stars are very hot, highly luminous, and rapidly evolving massive stars that are fusing helium or heavier elements in their cores.

== Characteristics ==
The strong, dense stellar winds from Wolf–Rayet stars consist of streams of charged particles traveling at speeds of thousands of kilometers per second. These winds slam into the surrounding interstellar medium, generating shock waves that heat and ionize the gas and dust, causing it to glow and emit radiation in visible and other wavelengths.

This process creates an enveloping nebula around the Wolf–Rayet star with a distinctive multi-ring structure. The nebula contains shells and cavities carved out by the stellar winds, surrounded by dense swept-up material. These structures become visible due to fluorescent emission from ionized gas as well as scattered starlight.

== Notable examples ==
Some well-studied Wolf–Rayet nebulae include:

- NGC 6888 (Crescent Nebula)
- NGC 2359 (Thor's Helmet Nebula)
- M1-67 (Luminous Blue Variable Nebula)
- NGC 3199 (Nebula around WR 18)

These nebulae exhibit intricate structures revealed in visible light as well as infrared, X-ray, and other wavelengths, providing insight into the powerful stellar winds and evolutionary processes around Wolf–Rayet stars.

== Formation and evolution ==
Wolf–Rayet stars represent a brief late stage in the evolution of some very massive stars. They have shed their outer hydrogen envelopes and their stellar winds now consist of heavier elements like helium, carbon, nitrogen, and oxygen.

As a Wolf–Rayet star evolves and loses mass, its winds shape the surrounding gas and dust into bubble-like nebular structures. The inner region forms from the current stellar wind, while outer shells are remnants of previous mass-loss episodes.

Eventually the star will shed more matter, ending its life in a spectacular supernova explosion that will dramatically alter the Wolf–Rayet nebula's structure and composition.
