= List of Wolf–Rayet stars =

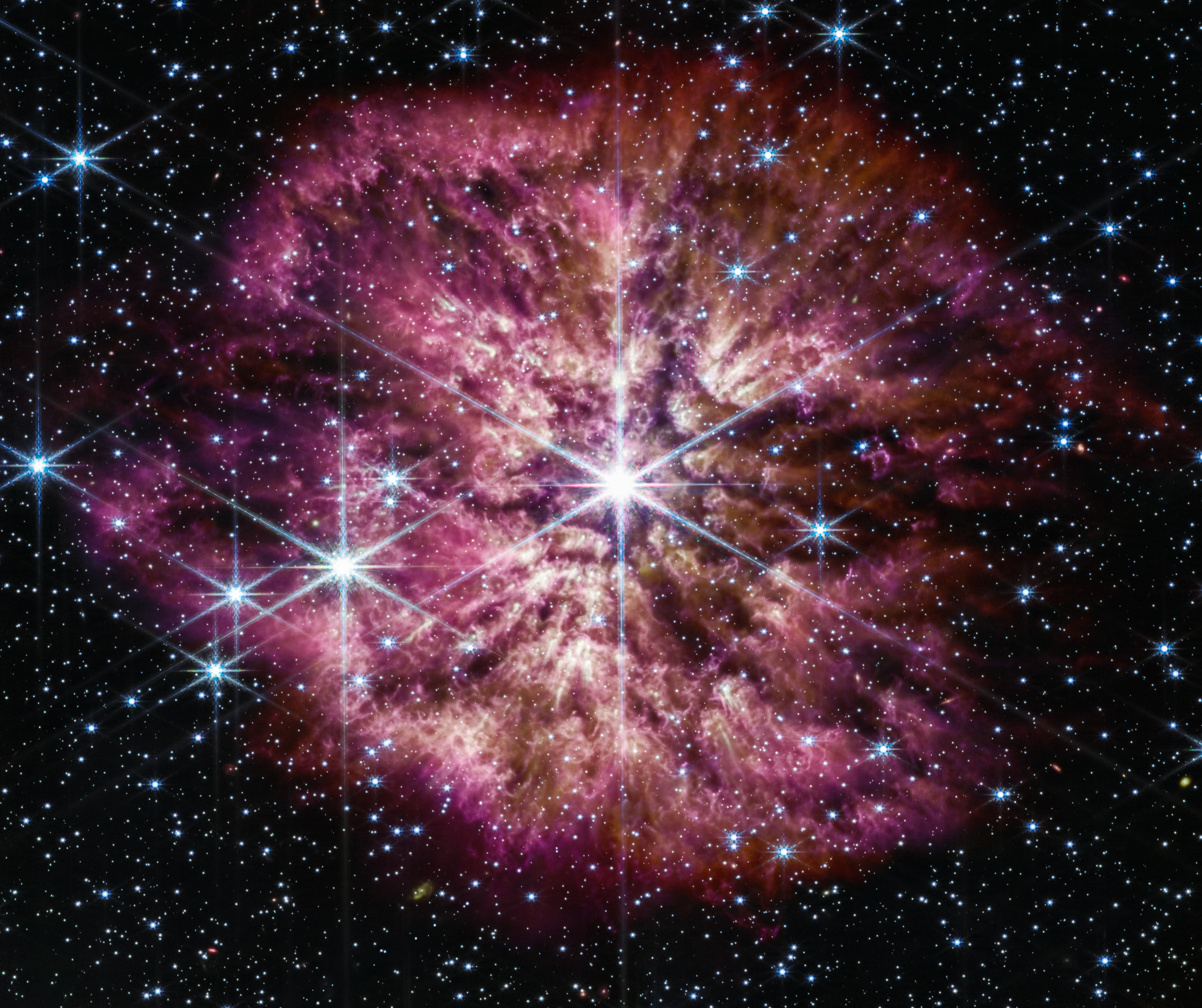
James Webb Space Telescope image of the Wolf–Rayet star WR 124 and the nebula M1–67 surrounding it (NIRCam and MIRI composite)

Wolf–Rayet stars, often abbreviated as WR stars, are a rare heterogeneous set of stars with unusual spectra showing prominent broad emission lines of ionised helium and highly ionised nitrogen or carbon. The spectra indicate very high surface enhancement of heavy elements, depletion of hydrogen, and strong stellar winds. The surface temperatures of known Wolf–Rayet stars range from 20,000 K to around 210,000 K, hotter than almost all other kinds of stars. They were previously called W-type stars referring to their spectral classification at that time.

This is a list of Wolf-Rayet stars, in order of their distance from Earth

== List ==
=== Milky Way Galaxy ===
Star system	Star Image	Median distance (ly)	Spectral type	Apparent magnitude (V)	Comments and references
Gamma² Velorum A (WR 11/Regor)		1096+26 −23	WC8	1.83	Closest Wolf-Rayet star to Earth. It has an O-type companion star.
WR 147 A		2,100 ± 200	WN8h	13.86 + 16.02	Has a B-type companion star.
HD 45166 A		3,232	qWR	9.88	The primary of HD 45166 is currently the only known example of a qWR star and has a B-type companion star.
HD 107969		3,377.2±153.6	WC		Center star of NGC 4361 Nebula.
WR 142		4,000	WO2	12.94	
HD 326823 (V1104 Scorpii)		4,142	WNpec	9.03	
HD 151932 (WR 78)		4,200	WN7h	6.45 - 6.61	
EZ Canis Majoris (WR 6)		4,900	WN4-s	6.91	
WR 144		5,120	WC4		
WR 111 (HD 165763)		5,316+320 −230	WC5	+7.82	
WR 140 A (SBC9 1232)		5,600 ± 300	WC7p	6.85	
HD 152408 (WR 79a)		5,600	WN9ha	5.81-5.85	
WR 93		5,900	WC7		
WR 134		6,000	WN6-s	8.08	
WR 135		6,000	WC8	8.11	
WR 133 A (V1676 Cyg)		6,100 ± 300	WN5o	6.75 - 6.84	
HD 152408 (WR 79a)		6,500	WN9ha	5.81-5.85	
WR 25 A (HD 93162)		6,500	O2.5If*/WN6	8.80	
Apep (WR 70-16)		6523+400 −300	WR + WR		
CV Serpentis (WR 113)		6,700 ± 200	WC8d	9.08	
WR 136 (HD 192163)		6,700 ± 500	WN6(h)-s	7.50	
WR 86		6849 ± 800	WR	9.27	
HD 192641 (WR 137)		6850+600 −500	WC7pd+O9Ve		
WR 114		7,200 ± 600	WC5	12.02	
HD 83535		7,270	WC3		Central star of NGC 2867 Nebula.
Theta Muscae (WR 48)		7,400	WC5/6	5.53	
WR 93b		7,600 ± 500	WO3	15.2	
PG 1159		8,000	WC	Central star of Engraved Hourglass Nebula.	
WR 2 (HD 6327)		8,186	WN2-w	11.33	
WR 22 (V429 Carinae)		8,300 ± 700	WN7h	6.42	
WR 104 (V5097 Sgr)		8,400	WC9d	13.28 + 15.36	
AG Pegasi		9,000	WR	6.0 - 9.4	
WR 8			WR		
WR 46 (DI Crucis)		9,300 ± 900	WN3p-w	10.83	
WR 3 (HD 9974)		9,458+520 −390	WN3-hw	10.69	
WR 128		9,500	WN4(h)-w	10.51	
WR 102		9,500 ± 600	WO2	14.10	
WR 138		10,000	WR		
WR 120		10,000	WN7w + WN3/4	11.93	
WR 119		10,500	WC9d	12.06	
WR 1 (V863 Cas/HD 4004)		10,500 ± 500	WN4-s	10.54	
WR 112		11050+2900 −2750	WC8-9d+OB		
WR 157		11285.01	WN4.5		Member of Markarian 50 Cluster.
WR 69		11,350	WC9d	9.1	
WR 156		11,900 ± 500	WN8h	11.01	
WR 9		12,000 ± 600	WC4	10.50	
WR 48a		12,400 ± 2000	WC8d+Oe		
WR 142a		13,000	WR		
WR 21a		13,100 ± 700	O3/WN5ha + O3Vz((f*))	12.661	
WR 138a		13,698	WN9h	15.44	
HD 16523 (WR 4/V493 Per)		14,000	WC6	9.99	
CD Crucis (WR 47)		14,000	WN6o	10.81	
WR 120–6		14,000	WN4		It is the central star of Abell 48 Planetary Nebula.
WR 24 (HD 93131)		14,000	WN6ha-w	6.48 - 6.50	
WR 20a		14,000 ± 1,000	O3If*/WN6 + O3If*/WN6	13.28	
NGC 2452 Central Star		15,000	WO1	Central star of NGC 2452.	
WR 142b		15,000	WR		
WR 7 (HD 56925)		16,000	WN4-s	11.56	
M4-18 Central star		17055+670 −440	WC11	Central star of M4-18.	
AG Carinae		17,000 ± 1,000	WN11	6.96	
WR 12 (V378 Velorum)		19,000 ± 1,000	WN8h	10.78	
MR 93 (WR 125)		19200+2350 −1900	WC7d+O9III		
OAO 1657-415		20,000	Ofpe/WN9	>23	
WR 124 (QR Sagittae)		21,000 ± 2,000	WN8h	11.50±0.11	
WR 30a		21,917+1,400 −1,090	WO4		
WR 121-16		23,190	WN7o/WC	14.02	
Cygnus X-3 (WR 145a/V1521 Cyg)		24,135±1,100	WN 4–6		
NGC 3603-A1 (WR 43a/HD 97950A1)		24,800	WN6h+WN6h	11.18	Part of NGC 3603 Nebula.
NGC 3603-B (WR 43b/HD 97950B)		24,800	WN6h	11.33	Part of NGC 3603 Nebula.
NGC 3603-C (WR 43c/HD 97950C)		24,800	WN6h	11.89	Part of NGC 3603 Nebula.
NGC 3603 MTT 58 (WR 43-2)		24,800	O2If*/WN6		
Arches-B1 (WR 102bc)		25,000	WN8-9h		Part of Arches Cluster.
Arches-F1 (WR 102ad)		25,000	WN8-9h		Part of Arches Cluster.
Arches-F2 (WR 102aa)		25,000	WN8–9h O5–6 Ia+ ||		Part of Arches Cluster.
Arches-F3 (WR 102bb)		25,000	WN8-9h		Part of Arches Cluster.
Arches-F4 (WR 102al)		25,000	WN7–8h		Part of Arches Cluster.
Arches-F5 (WR 102ai)		25,000	WN8-9h		Part of Arches Cluster.
Arches-F6 (WR 102ah)		25,000	WN8-9h		Part of Arches Cluster.
Arches-F7 (WR 102aj)		25,000	WN8-9h		Part of Arches Cluster.
Arches-F8 (WR 102ag)		25,000	WN8-9h		Part of Arches Cluster.
Arches-F9 (WR 102ae)		25,000	WN8-9h		Part of Arches Cluster.
Arches-F10 (WR 102ab)		25,000	O7–8 Ia+		Part of Arches Cluster.
Arches-F12 (WR 102af)		25,000	WN7–8h		Part of Arches Cluster.
Arches-F14 (WR 102ba)		25,000	WN8-9h		Part of Arches Cluster.
Arches-F16 (WR 102ak)		25,000	WN8-9h		Part of Arches Cluster.
Arches-F17 (WR 102ac)		25,000	O5–6 Ia+		Part of Arches Cluster.
WR 42e (2MASS J11144550-115001)		25,000	O3If*/WN6	14.53	
G0.059-0.068		26,000	B0-1Ia+/WNLh		
G0.238-0.071		26,000	WN11h		Located in the Galactic Center region of the Milky Way. It is an 'isolated' Wolf-Rayet star, spatially separated from known clusters. Its estimated luminosity, 5.0×10^{6} L_{☉}, places it in the list of most luminous stars.
WR 102ka (Peony Star)		26,000	Ofpe/WN9		
WR 102c		26,000	WN6	11.6	Part of Quintuplet cluster.
WR 102ea		26,000	WN9h	8.8	Part of Quintuplet cluster.
WR 102da		26,000	WC9?d		Part of Quintuplet cluster.
WR 102dc		26,000	WC9d + OB		Part of Quintuplet cluster.
WR 102ha		26,000	WC8/9d + OB		Part of Quintuplet cluster.
WR 102dd		26,000	WC9d		Part of Quintuplet cluster.
WR 102hb		26,000	WN9h		Part of Quintuplet cluster.
WR 102db		26,000	WC9?d		Part of Quintuplet cluster.
WR 102f		26,000	WC8		Part of Quintuplet cluster.
WR 102df		26,000	O6–8 I f (Of/WN?)		Part of Quintuplet cluster.
WR 102i		26,000	WN9h		Part of Quintuplet cluster.
WR 102d		26,000	WN9h		Part of Quintuplet cluster.
LHO 79		26,000	WC9d		Part of Quintuplet cluster.
GCIRS 13E (WR 101f)		26,000	WR		Located near Galactic Center.
GCIRS 16SW		26,000	Ofpe/WN9		Located near Galactic Center.
WR 101-2 (CXOGC J174516.1-284909)		26,092	Ofpe/WN9		
WR 148		27,000	WN8h + O5V?	10.3	
WR 31a (Hen 3-519)		28,000	WN11h	10.85	
WR 102e		28,000	WR		
WR 150		28,473+1,700 −1,380	WC5	13.47	
HD 826		30,000	WC8		Center Star of NGC 40 Nebula.
WR 102b		31,000	WR		
Mercer 30-1 A (WR 46-3 A)		40,000	WR		
Mercer 30-7 A		40,000	WR		

=== Magellanic Clouds ===
The Large Magellanic Cloud (LMC) is around 163 kly distant and the Small Magellanic Cloud (SMC) is around 204 kly distant.

Host galaxy	Star system	Median distance (ly)	Spectral type	Apparent magnitude (V)	Comments and references
LMC	LMC195-1	160,000	WO2	15.15	
LMC	LH 41-1042	160,000	WO4	13.95	
LMC	R145 (HD 269928)	163,000	WN6h + O3.5If*/WN7	12.04	
LMC	HD 38282 (BAT99-118/Brey 89)	163,000	WN5-6h + WN6-7h	11.11	
LMC	BAT99-7	163,000	WN4b	13.81	
LMC	BAT99-59	163,000	WR	Central star of NGC 2020.	
LMC	BAT99-123 (Brey 93)	163,000	WO3	15.204	
LMC	Melnick 34 (BAT99-116)	163,000	WN5h + WN5h	13.09	
LMC	R136a1 (RMC 136a1)	163,000	WN5h	12.23	
LMC	R136a2 (RMC 136a2)	163,000	WN5h	12.34	
LMC	R136a3	163,000	WN5h	12.97	
LMC	R136c	163,000	WN5h	12.86	
LMC	R71 (HD 269006)	164,000	WR	8.7 - 9.9 - 11.2	
LMC	VFTS 457	164,000	O3.5If*/WN7		
LMC	VFTS 482	164,000	O3If*/WN6-A		
LMC	VFTS 545	164,000	O2If*/WN5		
LMC	VFTS 682	164,000	WN5h	16.08	
LMC	VFTS 1022	164,000	O3.5If*/WN7		
LMC	R134	164,000	WR		
LMC	R146	164,000	WN4		
LMC	BAT99-98	165,000	WN6	13.38	
LMC	R99	165,000	Ofpe/WN10	11.46	
SMC	SMC AB7	197,000	WN4	13.016	
SMC	SMC AB8	197,000	WO4	12.83	
SMC	HD 5980	200,000	WN4	8.8 - 11.9	

=== Andromeda Galaxy and Triangulum Galaxy ===
The Andromeda Galaxy (M31) is 2.5 Mly distant and the Triangulum Galaxy is around 3.2 Mly distant

Host galaxy	Star system	Median distance (ly)	Spectral type	Apparent magnitude (V)	Comments and references
Triangulum	[BMS2003] 867	2,700,000	O4Iab+O4Ia		
Triangulum	Romano's Star	2,700,000	WN8h–WN11h	16.5–18.8	

=== Other galaxies ===
Host Galaxy	Star system	Median distance (ly)	Spectral type	Apparent magnitude (V)	Comments and references
NGC 6822	NGC 6822-WR 12 (LGGS J194513.50-144512.9)	1,540,000	WN4	18.96	
IC 1613	DR1 (CAIRNS J010501.61+020420.6)	2,350,000	WO3	19.857	
IC 10	IC 10 X-1 A	2,500,000 ± 0.5	WR		Has a black hole companion.
NGC 300	NGC 300 X-1 A	6,070,000 ± 0.23	WR		Has a black hole companion.
NGC 300	STWR 13	6,070,000 ± 0.23	WO4		
NGC 1313	[HC2007] 31	12,886,000	WO3		

== See also ==
- List of luminous blue variable stars
- List of O-type stars
