= List of hottest stars =

List of the hottest known stars

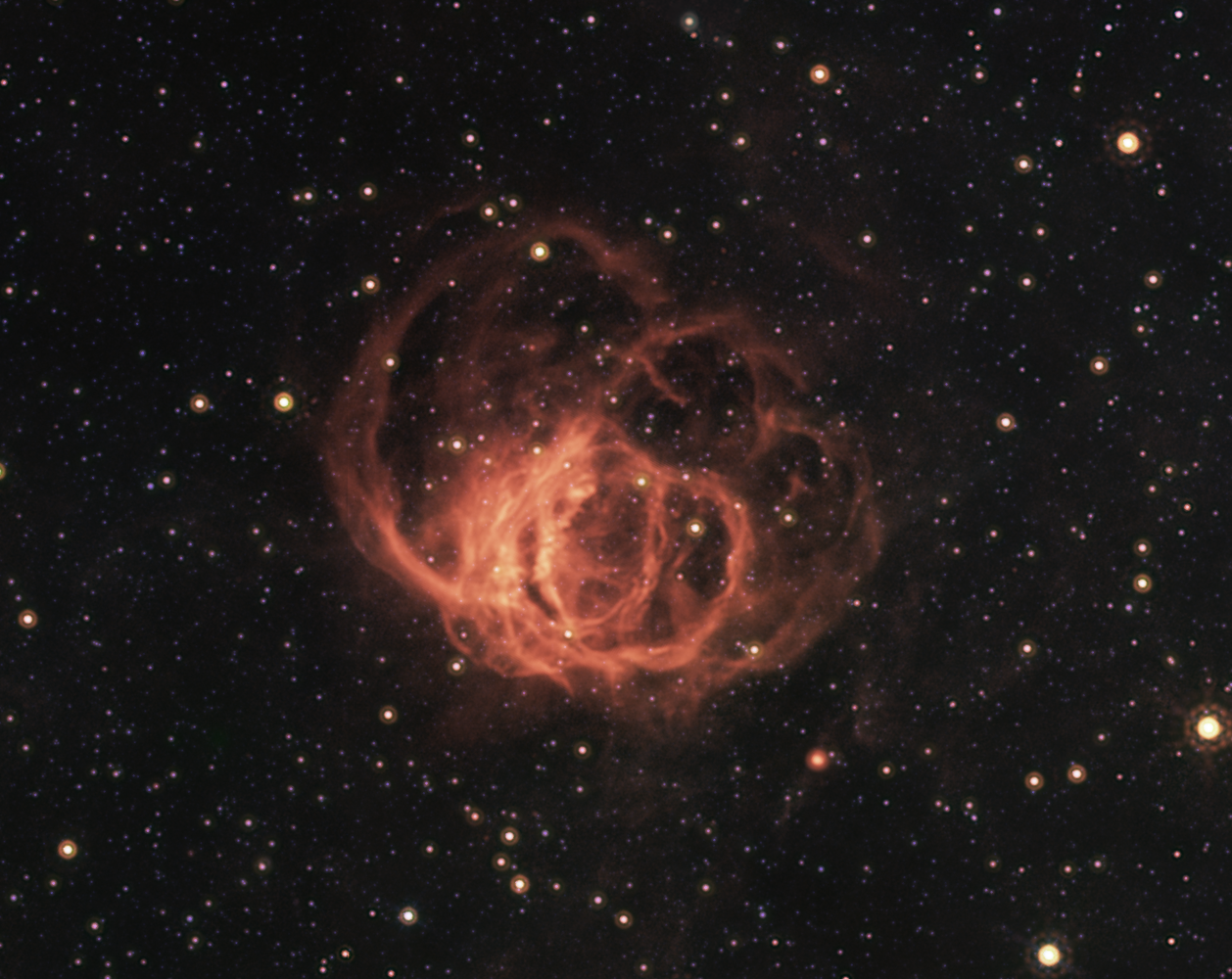
Nebula ejecta from the star WR 102

This is a list of hottest stars so far discovered (excluding degenerate stars), arranged by decreasing temperature. The stars with temperatures higher than 60,000 K are included.

== List ==
Star name	Effective Temperature (K)	Mass (M_{☉})	Luminosity (L_{☉})	Spectral type	Distance (light-years)	Description	Ref.
WR 102	200,000	16.1	380,000	WO2	8,610		
WR 142	200,000	28.6	912,000	WO2	5,400	Very young oxygen type WO star on the Berkeley 87 star cluster.	
LMC195-1	200,000		257,000	WO2	~160,000		
BAT99-123	170,000	7.7	158,000	WO3	~160,000		
WR 93b	160,000	8.1	110,000	WO3	7,470	A WO star with stellar wind speeds of 5750 km/s making it the record holder.	
[HC2007] 31	160,000?			WO3	12,886,000		
BAT99-53 A	158,000	13	224,000	WC4	~160,000		
BAT99-7	158,000	25	692,000	WN4b	~160,000		
IC 1613 DR1	150,000	20	480,000	WO3	~2,380,000	A Wolf-Rayet star located in the dwarf galaxy IC 1613. It is surrounded by a nebula.	
LH41-1042	150,000	8.4	182,000	WO4	~160,000		
BAT99-2	141,000	13	234,000	WN2	~160,000		
BAT99-94	141,000	24	631,000	WN3	~160,000		
WR 2	141,000	16	282,000	WN2	7,830		
AB8	141,000	19	1,413,000	WO4	~197,000		
BA 1-458	140,000	28.1	776,000	WO4	2,500,000		
WR 9 (WR)	139,700	9	501,000	WC4	14,900		
WR 30a (WR)	129,500	7.5-9.7	195,000	WO4	25,340		
WR 38	126,000	10.4	724,000	WC4	19,700		
WR 142a	125,000	7.9	110,000	WC8	5,900		
BAT99-128	112,000	14	275,000	WN3	~160,000		
WR 1	112,000	27	759,000	WN4-s	10,300		
WR 18	112,000	38	1,288,000	WN4-s	12,500		
WR 46	112,000	14	263,000	WN3pw	13,000		
WR 7	112,000	13	214,000	WN4-s	14,000		
WR 144	112,000	9.9	159,000	WC4	5,710		
WR 52	112,000	8.5	117,000	WC4	5,710		
AB7	105,000	23	1,259,000	WN4	~197,000		
BAT99-24	100,000	17	347,000	WN4b	~160,000		
WR 37	100,000	34	1,122,000	WN4-s	21,900		
NGC 6822-WR 12	100,000	36	1,288,000	WN4	~1,631,000		
Gamma Velorum (WR)	90,000	9	204,000	WC8	1,100	A quadruple star system	
BAT99-1	89,100	12	200,000	WN3b	~160,000		
EZ CMa	89,100	23	617,000	WN4-s	5,900	A Wolf-Rayet star that may be an eccentric binary star system.	
WR 36	89,100	12	200,000	WN5-s	17,700		
WR 111	89,100	13	245,000	WC5	5,320		
WR 150	89,100	24.8	724,000	WC5	28,500		
BAT99-3	79,400	16	324,000	WN4b	~160,000		
WR 19 A	79,400		400,000	WC5d	14,000		
WR 44	79,400	18	417,000	WN4-w	19,800		
WR 58	79,400	8.4	89,100	WN4/WCE	19,700		
BAT99-37	79,400	19	447,000	WN3o	160,000		
WR 45	79,400	14.1	282,000	WC6	13,900		
BAT99-26	70,800	18	417,000	WN4b	~160,000		
BAT99-35	70,800	24	398,000	WN3(h)	~160,000		
BAT99-86	70,800	12	427,000	WN3(h)	~160,000		
WR 136	70,800	15	260,000	WN6(h)-s	6,290	Fast stellar winds created the Crescent nebula	
WR 75	63,100	18	389,000	WN6-s	10,800		
WR 134	63,100	19	400,000	WN6-s	6,000	A Wolf-Rayet star that is very bright	
WR 60	63,100	23	631,000	WC8	11,500		
WR 149	63,100	14	269,000	WN5-s	15,900		

== See also ==
- List of most massive stars
- List of most luminous stars
- List of least massive stars
- List of coolest stars
