= WR 128 =

Wolf-Rayet star in the constellation Sagitta

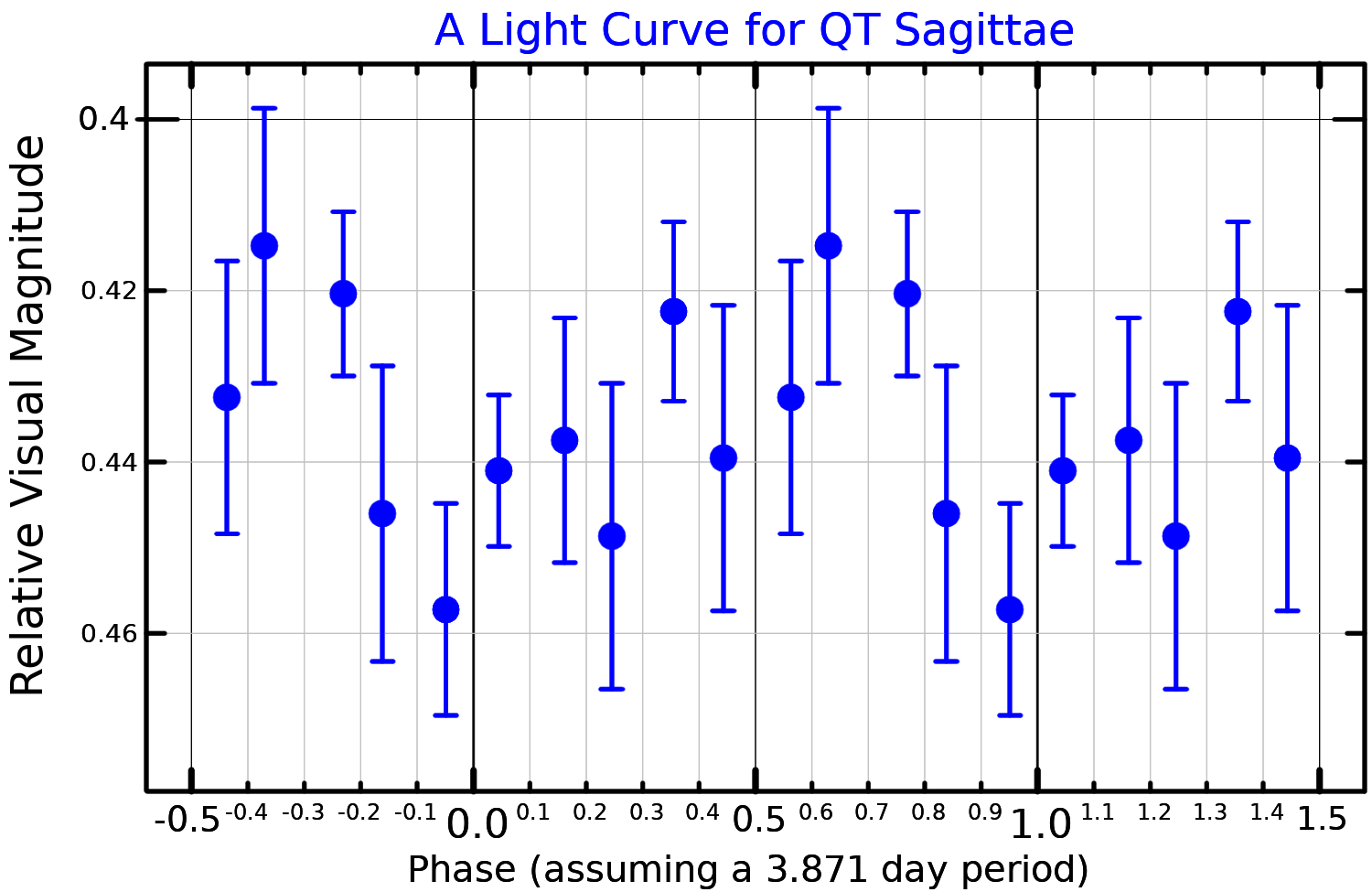
- A visual band light curve for QT Sagittae, adapted from Antokhin and Cherepashchuk (1985)

Observation data Epoch J2000 Equinox J2000
- Constellation: Sagitta
- Right ascension: 19^{h} 48^{m} 32.19674^{s}
- Declination: +18° 12′ 03.6956″
- Apparent magnitude (V): 10.51

Characteristics
- Evolutionary stage: Wolf–Rayet
- Spectral type: WN4(h)-w
- U−B color index: −0.89
- B−V color index: −0.02

Astrometry
Radial velocity (R_{v})	100.00 km/s
Proper motion (μ)	RA: −0.233 mas/yr Dec.: −5.455 mas/yr
Parallax (π)	0.2836±0.0202 mas
Distance	2,900+540 −390 pc
Absolute magnitude (M_{V})	−3.27

Details
Mass	11 M_{☉}
Radius	2.69 R_{☉}
Luminosity	166,000 L_{☉}
Temperature	70,800 K

Other designations
- QT Sagittae, HD 187282, WR 128, HIP 97456, 2MASS J19483219+1812036

Database references
SIMBAD	data

WR 128 is a Wolf–Rayet star located about 9,500 light years away in the constellation of Sagitta. A member of the WN class, WR 128's spectrum resembles that of a WN4 star, but hydrogen is clearly present in the star (hence the h in its spectrum), making it the only known hydrogen-rich WN4 star in the galaxy. However, similar H-rich very early WN stars can be found in the LMC and especially in the SMC, but the only other galactic examples of this are WR 3 and WR 152.

In 1981, Igor Antokhin et al. discovered that the star, then known as HD 187282, is a variable star. It was given its variable star designation, QT Sagittae, in 1985.

== Properties ==
Analysis of WR 128's spectrum with PoWR shows that it has a temperature of around 70,800 K and is losing mass at a very slow pace (in Wolf–Rayet terms), at 10^{−5.4} M_{☉}/yr, or in other words, 1 solar mass every 250,000 years. All this mass is being carried by a very strong stellar wind with a terminal velocity of 2,050 kilometres per second. Taking its distance into account, WR 128 has a luminosity of 166,000 L_{☉}, or 10^{5.22} L_{☉}, making it one of the dimmest galactic WN stars. Using the Stefan-Boltzmann Law, a radius of 2.69 R_{☉} is obtained. A "transformed" radius at an optical depth of 2/3, more comparable to other types of stars, is at about 13 R_{☉}.
