= WR 3 =

Star in the constellation Cassiopeia

Observation data Epoch J2000 Equinox ICRS
- Constellation: Cassiopeia
- Right ascension: 01^{h} 38^{m} 55.62741^{s}
- Declination: +58° 09′ 22.6738″
- Apparent magnitude (V): 10.69

Characteristics
- Evolutionary stage: Wolf-Rayet
- Spectral type: WN3-hw
- U−B color index: −0.86
- B−V color index: +0.02

Astrometry
Radial velocity (R_{v})	100.00 km/s
Proper motion (μ)	RA: −4.200±0.013 mas/yr Dec.: −1.550±0.012 mas/yr
Parallax (π)	0.4376±0.0184 mas
Distance	2,900+520 −390 pc
Absolute magnitude (M_{V})	−3.13

Details
Mass	15 M_{☉}
Radius	2.48 R_{☉}
Luminosity	363,000 L_{☉}
Temperature	89,100 K

Other designations
- HD 9974, WR 3, HIP 7681, 2MASS J01385562+5809227

Database references
SIMBAD	data

WR 3 is a Wolf-Rayet star located around 9,500 light years away from Earth in the constellation of Cassiopeia.

WR 3 is a member of the nitrogen sequence of WR stars and has a spectrum with strong He_{II} and N_{V} lines, but weak N_{IV}. He_{I} lines are very weak or missing, but there are lines of O_{VI}. Unusually, there are lines of hydrogen and absorption components in many lines creating P Cygni profiles. The emission is weaker overall than stars of similar spectral type, and it has often been suggested that WR 3 has a type O binary companion. However, there are no other signs of a companion and it is thought to be a single star with a spectral type of WN3-hw. The "h" and "w" indicate that hydrogen is present and the emission is relatively weak for its class.

Ordered by right ascension, WR 3 was the third star in the Sixth Catalogue of galactic Wolf-Rayet stars. WR 1 and WR 2 are also both early WN stars in Cassiopeiae.

WR 3 is a massive and luminous star. The presence of hydrogen in its spectrum suggests that it is younger than hydrogen-free WR stars and may still be in the process of ejecting the remainder of its hydrogen. The emission lines of heavy elements in its spectrum are produced by strong convection and powerful stellar winds rather than complete loss of the outer layers of the star. The wind has been measured at 2,700 km/s leading to mass being lost at four millionths M_{☉} per year.
