= NGC 2359 =

Emission nebula in the constellation Canis Major

Thor’s Helmet Nebula
Emission nebula
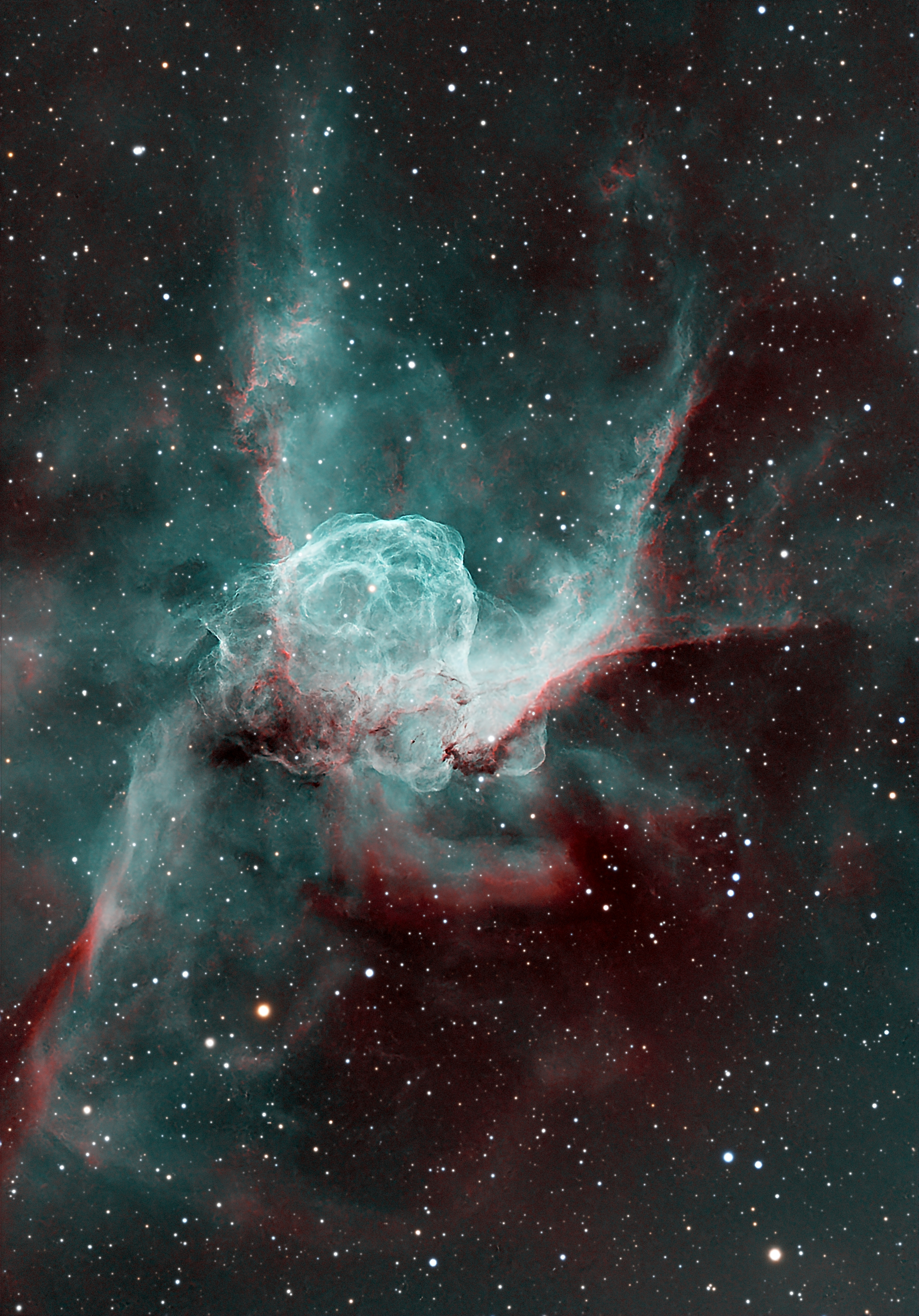

Observation data: J2000 epoch
- Right ascension: 07^{h} 18^{m} 30^{s}
- Declination: −13° 13.8′ ″
- Distance: 11,960 ly (3,670 pc) ly
- Apparent dimensions (V): 9′ × 6′
- Constellation: Canis Major
- Notable features: HII (ionized) region
- Designations: GUM 4, LBN 227.66-00.09, SH 2-298, GRS 227.80 -00.20, LBN 1041, RCW 5

NGC 2359, also known as the Flying Eye Nebula or Duck Head Nebula, is an emission nebula in the constellation Canis Major. It also known as Thor's Helmet. The nebula is approximately 3,670 parsecs (11.96 thousand light years) away and 30 light-years in size. The central star is the Wolf-Rayet star WR7, an extremely hot star thought to be in a brief pre-supernova stage of evolution. It is similar in nature to the Bubble Nebula, but interactions with a nearby large molecular cloud are thought to have contributed to the more complex shape and curved bow-shock structure of Thor's Helmet.

It is also catalogued as Sharpless 2-298 and Gum 4.

The nebula has an overall bubble shape, but with complex filamentary structures. The nebula contains several hundred solar masses of ionised material, plus several thousand more of unionised gas. It is largely interstellar material swept up by winds from the central star, although some material does appear to be enriched with the products of fusion and is likely to come directly from the star. The expansion rate of different portions of the nebula varies from 10 km/s to at least 30 km/s, leading to age estimates of 78,500 - 236,000 years. The nebula has been studied at radio and x-ray wavelengths, but it is still unclear whether it was produced at the class O main sequence stage of development, as a red supergiant, luminous blue variable, or mainly as a Wolf-Rayet star.

NGC 2361 is a bright knot of nebulosity on one edge of the central ring of NGC 2359.
