= NGC 2452 =

Planetary nebula in the constellation Puppis

Emission nebula
- Planetary nebula
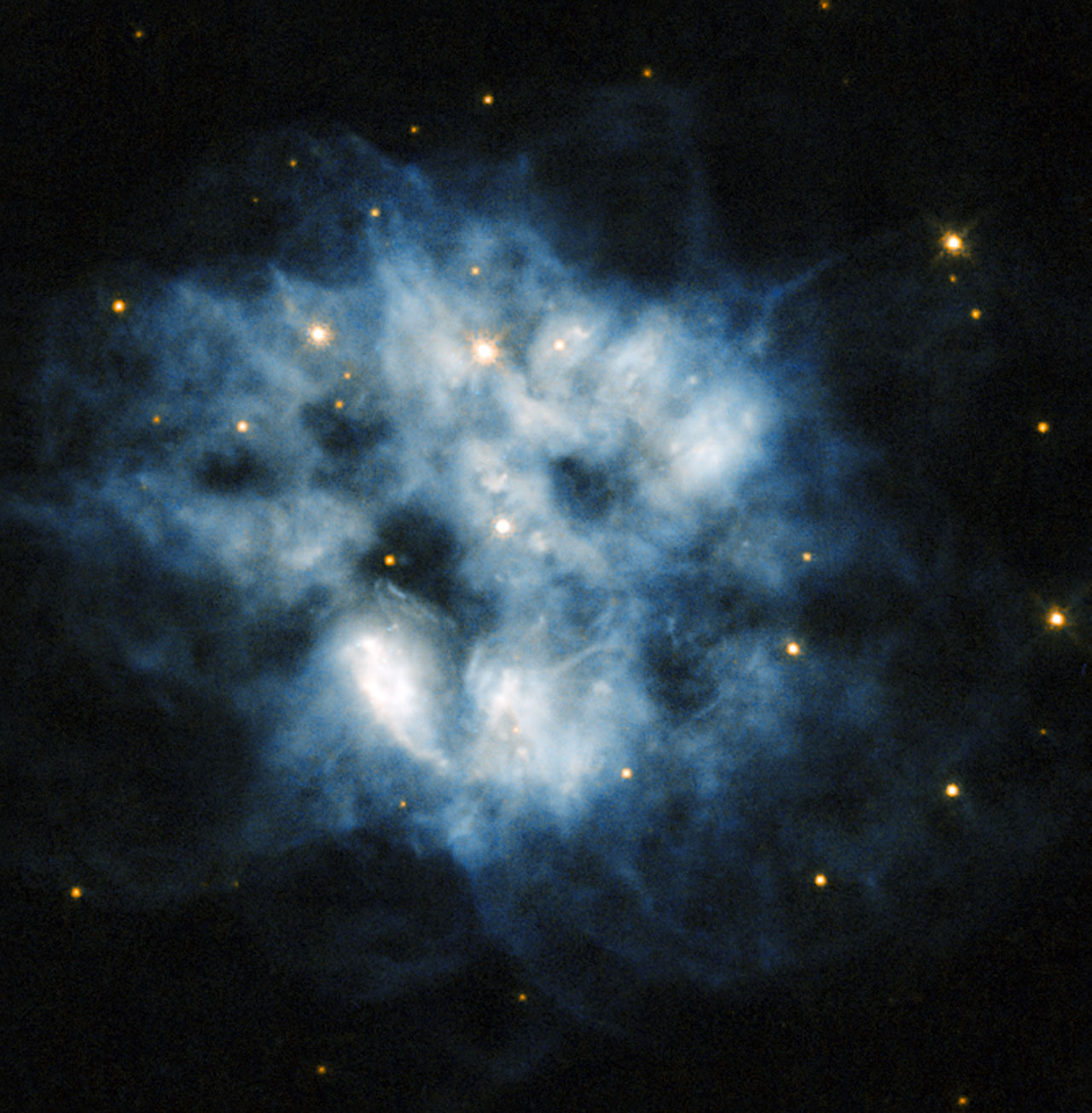
- Composite image using optical images from the HST

Observation data: J2000 epoch
- Right ascension: 07^{h} 47^{m} 26.27^{s}
- Declination: −27° 20′ 06.6″
- Distance: 15,000 ly (4,700 pc)
- Apparent magnitude (V): 17.9B
- Constellation: Puppis

Physical characteristics
- Radius: 1 ly
- Designations: Hen 2-4, PN G243.3-01.0, RCW 17, ESO 493-11, IRAS 07453-2712, PN ARO 93, SCM 30, GCRV 5190, 2MASS J07472626-2720066, PN Sa 2-16, V* V354 Pup, GRS G243.50 -01.00, MSX5C G243.3792-01.0384, PN VV' 72 WRAY 15-85, GSC2 S1322002590, PK 243-01 1, PN VV 46 [N75] 62

NGC 2452 is a planetary nebula located in the southern constellation of Puppis. NGC 2452 was discovered by Sir John Herschel in 1847.

NGC 2452 is located about 15,000 light-years (4.7 kiloparsecs) away from the Earth, and is about 40 to 50 thousand years old. In the sky, it appears close to the open cluster NGC 2453, and was previously thought to be a possible member of that cluster. However, it is merely a coincidence, and they are unrelated to each other; NGC 2452 is a foreground object relative to NGC 2453.

The central star of NGC 2452 has a spectral type of [WO1], and its progenitor would have had a high mass of about 7 M_{☉}, close to the upper limit of planetary nebula formation.
