= Abell 48 =

Planetary nebula in the constellation Aquila

Emission nebula
- Planetary nebula
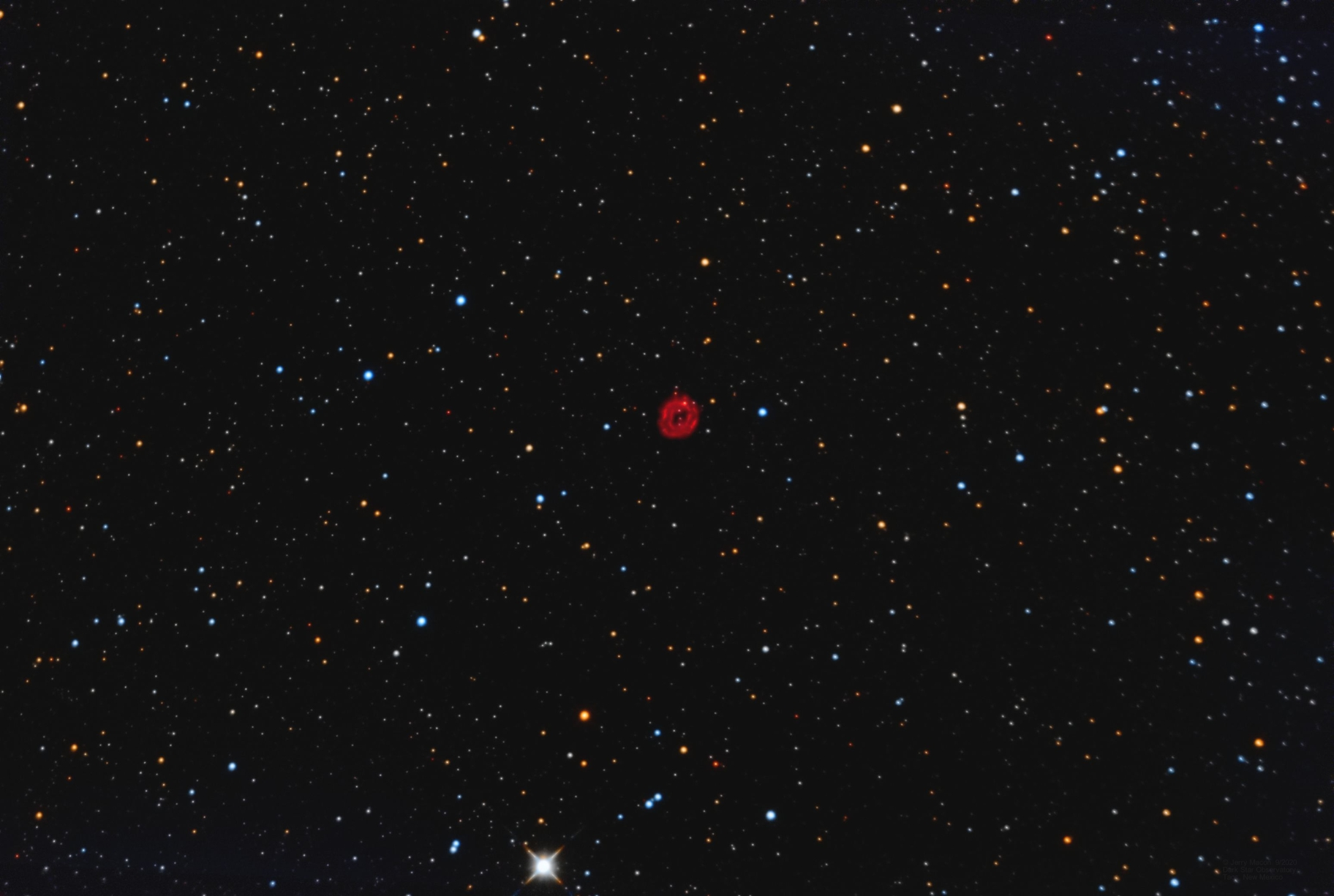
- Abell 48, imaged by Jerry Macon

Observation data: J2000.0 epoch
- Right ascension: 18^{h} 42^{m} 46.921^{s}
- Declination: −3° 13′ 17.3″
- Distance: 14,889.41 ly
- Apparent magnitude (V): 17.8
- Apparent dimensions (V): 0.7 by 0.7 arcmin
- Constellation: Aquila

Physical characteristics
- Radius: 1.05 ly
- Absolute magnitude (V): −1.34
- Notable features: contains a rare [WN] central star
- Designations: PK 029-00.1, PN G 029.0+00.4, Abel 36, WR 120-6 (central star), [GKF2010] MN50, IRAS 18401-0316, Gaia DR2 4258557110213184896

Abell 48 is a planetary nebula likely located around 14,000 light years away in the constellation of Aquila. It is noteworthy among planetary nebulae for hosting a rare WN-type Wolf-Rayet-type central star, a [WN4]-type star, which was once thought to be a bona-fide Wolf-Rayet star, and received the name WR 120–6. The nebula is made up of two rings surrounding the central star, and is heavily reddened, with an E(B-V) value of 2.14 and a visual extinction of 6.634 magnitudes, which is why it appears so dim.

== Properties ==
Assuming a distance of 1.9 kiloparsecs (about 6,200 light years), the nebula would have a diameter of 0.38 parsecs (~1.24 light years), and would be about 6,500 years old. The central star, with an initial mass of approximately 3 solar masses, would have left the asymptotic giant branch (AGB) approximately 9,000 years ago. The central star of this nebula would be about 5,500 times brighter than the Sun, with a surface temperature of around 70,000 Kelvins and a size just under half that of the Sun. However, this may be slightly inaccurate given the different distance suggested by Gaia, which is about 67% larger than the one used in the study to derive the aforementioned properties.
