= WR 101-2 =

Star in the constellation Sagittarius

Observation data Epoch J2000 Equinox J2000
- Constellation: Sagittarius
- Right ascension: 17^{h} 45^{m} 16.1^{s}
- Declination: −28° 49′ 09″

Characteristics
- Evolutionary stage: Wolf-Rayet
- Spectral type: Ofpe/WN9

Astrometry
Distance	8,000 pc

Details
Radius	79 R_{☉}
Luminosity	2,399,000 L_{☉}
Temperature	20,000 K

Other designations
- WR 101-2, CXOGC J174516.1-284909

Database references
SIMBAD	data

WR 101-2, also known as CXOGC J174516.1-284909, is a Wolf-Rayet star located in the Galactic Center, about 8,000 pc away from Earth. Its size has been estimated at 79 R_{☉}.

== Properties ==
WR 101-2's spectral type is Ofpe/WN9, signifying it as being a slash star, a Wolf-Rayet star which in this case contains extra nitrogen and helium emission in its spectrum as well as a P Cygni profile. Assuming a distance of 8,000 pc (appropriate as the massive star is apparently located in the Galactic Center, a structure known to be about 8,000 pc away), a K-band magnitude of 7.89, a K-band extinction of 1.7, and a K-band bolometric correction of -2.9, the luminosity turns out to be 2.4 million times that of the Sun (Log(L) = 6.38), making it one of the brightest stars known and certainly in the Galactic Center.

WR 101-2's effective temperature was estimated to be about 20,000 K, one of the coolest for any Wolf-Rayet star. The resulting radius for this is 129 R_{☉}.
