= WR 138a =

Wolf-Rayet star in the constellation Cygnus

Observation data Epoch J2000 Equinox J2000
- Constellation: Cygnus
- Right ascension: 20^{h} 17^{m} 08.11932^{s}
- Declination: +41° 07′ 26.9937″
- Apparent magnitude (V): 15.44

Characteristics
- Evolutionary stage: Wolf-Rayet
- Spectral type: WN9h
- B−V color index: 1.81

Astrometry
Proper motion (μ)	RA: −4.568 mas/yr Dec.: −4.834 mas/yr
Parallax (π)	0.0893±0.0131 mas
Distance	4200 pc

Details
Mass	13 M_{☉}
Radius	9.4 R_{☉}
Luminosity	200,000 L_{☉}
Temperature	40,000 K
Age	6.7 Myr

Other designations
- HBHA 4202-22, 2MASS J20170811+4107270

Database references
SIMBAD	data

WR 138a is a Wolf-Rayet star in the constellation Cygnus. It is of a very late spectral type of WN9h. The WR is also at the centre of a ring nebula (typical of WRs) and is a runaway.

== Position and Discovery ==
WR 138a was first identified as a star with H-Alpha emission in 1997. Its Wolf-Rayet nature was discovered in 2009, along with its physical parameters. Although WR 138a is located in the Cygnus X complex from our viewpoint, in actually it is further away (4,200 pc compared to ~1,800 pc) and unrelated to the complex.

The star is also very reddenned, and in the visible wavelength, it is reddenned by 7.4 magnitudes. It is also a runaway star, with a peculiar velocity of 50 km/sec^{−1}, and is located about 230 pc above the galactic plane.

=== Nebula ===
WR 138a has a ring nebula around it, which measures 2.3 arcminutes across, and in reality measures about 1.4 pc across. WR 138a is offset from the centre of the nebula by around 0.2 arcminutes.

== Properties ==
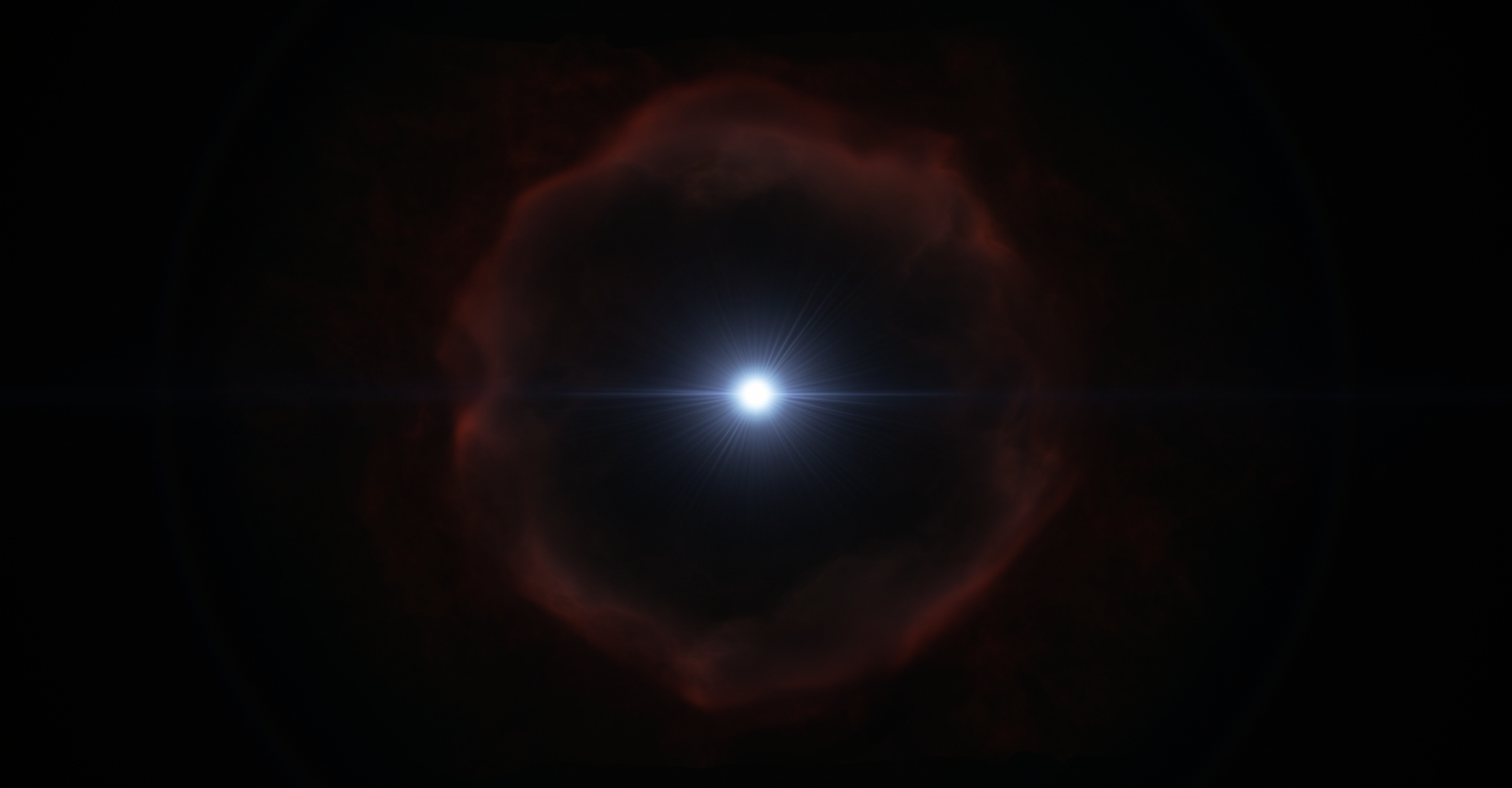
An artist's impression of WR 138a

WR 138a is a relatively dim WNL star. Modelling WR 138a's spectrum with PoWR gives a luminosity of around 200,000 L☉ and a temperature of approximately 40,000 K. Using the Stefan-Boltzmann Law the star's radius can be calculated, which turns out at approximately 9.4 R☉. WR 138a has a very strong stellar wind, typical of Wolf-Rayet stars, and it loses 10^{−4.7} M☉ (about 2×10^{−5} M_{☉}) per year because of this stellar wind, which has a terminal velocity of about 700 kilometres per second. Therefore, the star loses around 1 solar mass every 50,000 years.

== Evolution ==
WR 138a has a current mass of about 13 M☉, and probably evolved from a star with an initial mass of about 30 M☉, and is about 6.7 million years old. The small size and nearly circular shape of the nebula around WR 138a imply that the stellar wind interacts with the dense ambient medium comoving with the star, which is what shapes the nebula. This consideration suggests that the immediate precursor of WR 138a was a red supergiant (i.e. the star's initial mass is below 40 M☉) and that the WR wind still propagates and ploughs through the high-density region around the star, which is occupied by material shed by the star during its RSG phase.

According to evolution models, stars with initial masses of 25 to 40 M☉ have lifecycles of O → RSG → WN, and the evolution of WR 138a is consistent with the models. Considering average cumulative RSG mass loss values, and velocities, a dynamical age of WR 138a's nebula can be obtained, which turns out at 14,000 years old, which suggests that WR 138a only recently entered the WR phase.
