= AG Pegasi =

Star in the constellation Pegasus

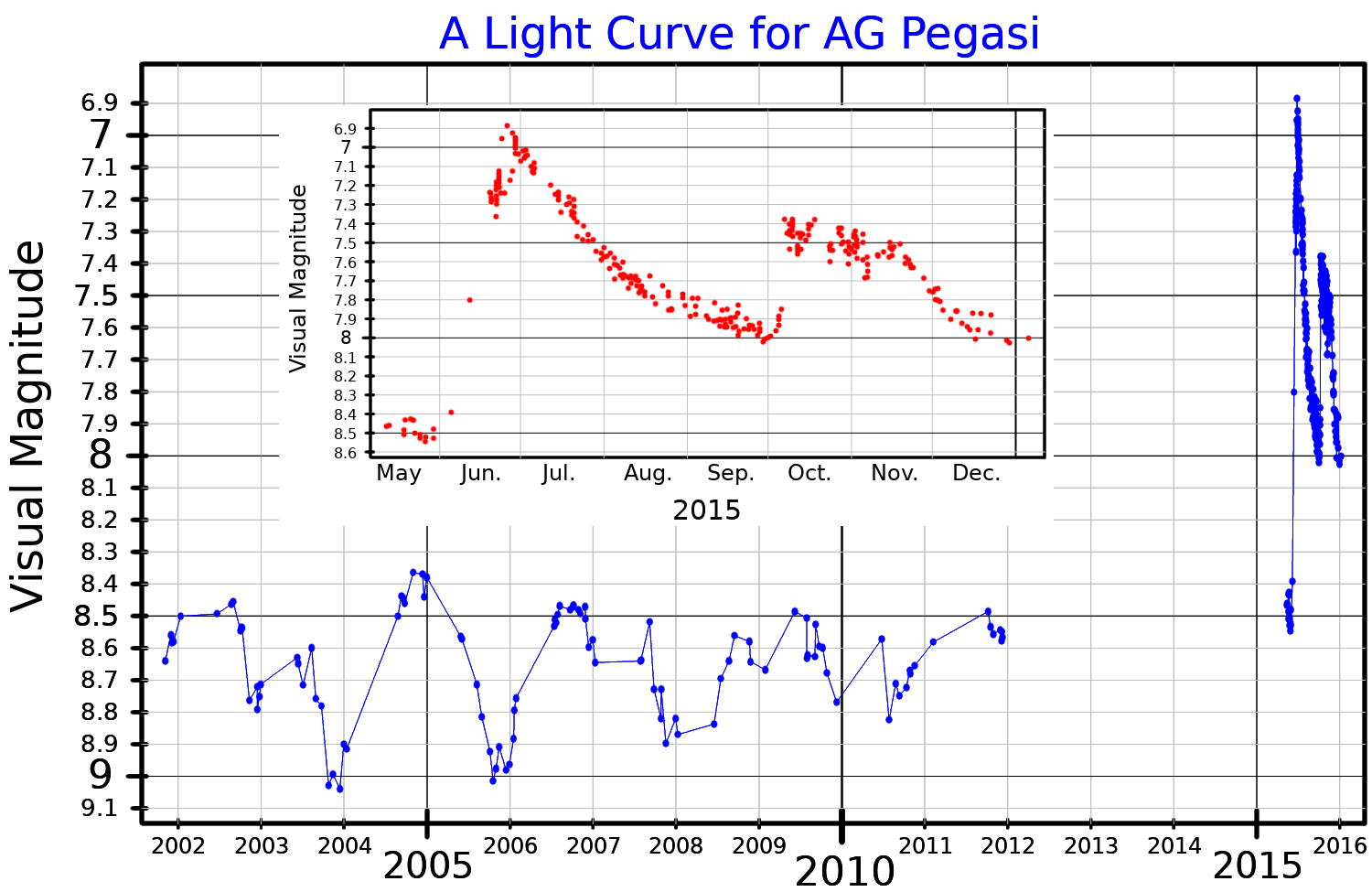
- A visual band light curve for AG Pegasi. The inset plot shows the 2015 flare with an expanded time scale. Adapted Skopal from et al. (2012) and Skopal et al. (2017)

Observation data Epoch J2000 Equinox ICRS
- Constellation: Pegasus
- Right ascension: 21^{h} 51^{m} 01.97393^{s}
- Declination: +12° 37′ 32.1279″
- Apparent magnitude (V): 6.0 - 9.4

Characteristics
- Spectral type: var + M3III
- B−V color index: 1.158±0.031
- Variable type: Symbiotic nova

Astrometry
Radial velocity (R_{v})	−15.86±0.15 km/s
Proper motion (μ)	RA: −1.382 mas/yr Dec.: −1.728 mas/yr
Parallax (π)	0.7358±0.0354 mas
Distance	2,600 or 4,100±160 ly (800 or 1,270±50 pc)
Absolute magnitude (M_{V})	/-1.0

Orbit
Period (P)	818.2±1.6 days
Semi-major axis (a)	2.5±0.1 AU
Eccentricity (e)	0.110±0.039
Periastron epoch (T)	2,446,812±48 HJD
Argument of periastron (ω) (primary)	112±22°
Semi-amplitude (K_{1}) (primary)	5.44±0.20 km/s

Details

White dwarf
Mass	0.49 M_{☉}
Radius	0.06 R_{☉}
Luminosity	1,729 L_{☉}
Surface gravity (log g)	6.67 cgs
Temperature	150,000 K

Red giant
Mass	1.33 M_{☉}
Radius	151+9 −8 R_{☉}
Luminosity	1,150 L_{☉}
Temperature	3,500 K
Metallicity [Fe/H]	−0.51 dex

Other designations
- BD+11°4673, HD 207757, HIP 107848, SAO 107436

Database references
SIMBAD	data

AG Pegasi is a symbiotic binary star in the constellation Pegasus, composed of a red giant and white dwarf which are separated by 2.5 astronomical units and complete an orbit every 818 days. It is classified as a symbiotic nova; it has undergone one extremely slow nova outburst and a smaller outburst.

Initially a magnitude 9 star, AG Pegasi brightened and peaked at an apparent magnitude of 6.0 around 1885 before gradually fading to magnitude 9 in the late 20th century. Its spectrum was noted by earlier observers to resemble P Cygni. The spectrum of the hotter star has changed drastically over 160 years, leading investigators Scott Kenyon and colleagues to surmise that its hotter component, originally a white dwarf, accumulated enough material from the donor giant star to begin burning hydrogen and enlarge and brighten into an A-type white supergiant around 1850. It had this spectrum and an estimated surface temperature of around 10,000 K in 1900, with a likely radius 16 times that of the Sun, before becoming a B-class star in 1920, then an O-class star in 1940, and finally a Wolf-Rayet star in 1970, with a surface temperature of 95,000 K since 1978. It has shrunk to a star with a diameter 1.1 times that of the Sun in 1949, then 0.15 times in 1978 and 0.08 times that of the Sun in 1990. AG Pegasi has been described as the slowest nova ever recorded, with the hotter component having a constant bolometric luminosity for over 130 years from 1850 to 1980. By the late 20th century, it had evolved into a hot subdwarf on its way to eventually returning to white dwarf status.

Vogel and colleagues calculated the hotter star must have been accreting material from the red giant for around 5,000 years before erupting. Both stars are ejecting material in stellar winds. The resulting nebula contains material from both stars and is complex in nature.

From 1997 until 2015, AG Pegasi entered a quiescent phase with no further change to its brightness; then the hot component increased in temperature, which caused the nebulosity around the stars to become more ionised and increase in brightness. The combination of the extremely slow nova and smaller outburst means that AG Pegasi is classed as a symbiotic nova.
