= WR 156 =

Young massive and luminous star in the constellation Cepheus

Observation data Epoch J2000 Equinox J2000
- Constellation: Cepheus
- Right ascension: 23^{h} 00^{m} 10.12539^{s}
- Declination: +60° 55′ 38.4109″
- Apparent magnitude (V): 11.01

Characteristics
- Evolutionary stage: Wolf-Rayet
- Spectral type: WN8h
- B−V color index: +1.17

Astrometry
Proper motion (μ)	RA: −2.596 mas/yr Dec.: −1.768 mas/yr
Parallax (π)	0.2749±0.0125 mas
Distance	11,900 ± 500 ly (3,600 ± 200 pc)
Absolute magnitude (M_{V})	−7.00

Details
Mass	32 M_{☉}
Radius	20.81 R_{☉}
Luminosity	1,023,000 L_{☉}
Temperature	39,800 K

Other designations
- WR 156, HIP 113569, 2MASS J23001010+6055385, MR 119

Database references
SIMBAD	data

WR 156 is a young massive and luminous Wolf–Rayet star in the constellation of Cepheus. Although it shows a WR spectrum, it is thought to be a young star still fusing hydrogen in its core.

== Distance ==
WR 156 has a Hipparcos parallax of 3.16" indicating a distance of about a thousand light years, although with a fairly large margin of error. Other studies indicate that it is much more distant based on a very high luminosity and faint apparent magnitude. The Gaia DR1 parallax is 0.07". The margin of error is larger than the measured parallax, but still the indication is for a very large distance. In Gaia Data Release 2, the parallax is given as 0.2090±0.0251 mas but with a marker that the result may be unreliable. In Gaia Data Release 3, the solution was adjusted to 0.2749±0.0125 mas, still with significant astrometric noise excess.

== Physical properties ==
WR 156 has a WR spectrum on the nitrogen sequence, indicating strong emission of helium and nitrogen, but it also shows features of hydrogen. Therefore, it is given a spectral type of WN8h. Its outer layers are calculated to contain 30% hydrogen, one of the highest levels for any galactic Wolf Rayet star.

WR 156 has a low temperature and slow stellar wind by Wolf Rayet standards, only 39,800 K and 660 km/s respectively. The wind is very dense, with total mass loss of more than 1/100,000 M_{☉}/year.

WR 156 is a young hydrogen-rich star, still burning hydrogen in its core but sufficiently luminous to have convected up nitrogen and helium fusion products to its surface. It shows 27% hydrogen at its surface. It is estimated to have had an initial mass of 50 M_{☉} several million years ago.
