= WR 114 =

Star in the constellation Scutum

Observation data Epoch J2000 Equinox J2000
- Constellation: Scutum
- Right ascension: 18^{h} 23^{m} 16.34^{s}
- Declination: −13° 43′ 26.2″
- Apparent magnitude (V): 12.02

Characteristics
- Evolutionary stage: Wolf-Rayet
- Spectral type: WC5
- U−B color index: +0.54
- B−V color index: +0.97

Astrometry
Proper motion (μ)	RA: 0.307 mas/yr Dec.: −1.931 mas/yr
Parallax (π)	0.4500±0.0369 mas
Distance	7,200 ± 600 ly (2,200 ± 200 pc)
Absolute magnitude (M_{V})	−4.19

Details
Mass	13.1+1.3 −1.0 M_{☉}
Radius	2.68 R_{☉}
Luminosity	245,000 L_{☉}
Temperature	79,000 K

Other designations
- HD 169010, GSC 05702-01056, 2MASS J18231633-1343261, WR 114

Database references
SIMBAD	data

WR 114 is a Wolf-Rayet star in the constellation of Scutum. It is an early type star of the carbon sequence (WCE) classified as WC5.

== Companion ==
WR 114 is listed in the Catalogue of galactic Wolf Rayet stars as a possible binary system with an OB companion, but more recent studies have not confirmed this and it is now considered a single WC5 star. No x-rays have been detected from WR 114, which would be expected by a close hot companion.

== Properties ==
The modelled temperature as a single star is 79,000 K, but this is an arbitrary temperature. A Wolf-Rayet star consists of a dense "core", with its surface defined as the sonic point, and a surrounding optically dense wind. The observed radiation from the star is entirely generated at different layers within the wind. The properties of a Wolf Rayet star are typically reported at an "inner boundary" of the wind, arbitrarily set at an optical depth of 20. The radius of this inner boundary in WR 114 is 2.51 R_{☉}. The sonic point of WR 114 lies at about optical depth 60. At this level the temperature is much hotter. Another common definition for the surface of a star is at optical depth 2/3. For WR 114, this is at about 3.2 R_{☉} and the corresponding temperature is around 65,000 K. The luminosity is around 245,000 L_{☉} due to the extreme temperature, with most of this emitted as ultraviolet radiation.

The stellar wind from WR 114 is powered by the high temperature and luminosity to a speed of 2,000 km/s. It is calculated to have a current mass of 13 M_{☉} and to be losing this mass at three millionths of M_{☉} per year.

== IRC −10414 ==
WR 114 is about 45" from another luminous star of similar brightness. IRC −10414 is a red supergiant about 6,500 light years away. At this distance, the projected separation between the two stars would be 0.43 parsecs. WR 114 is listed in the Catalogue of galactic Wolf Rayet stars at around 6,500 light years, but more recent modelling estimates it to be brighter and hence probably more distant. IRC −10414 is a runaway with a visible bow shock and it is thought that a Wolf-Rayet star less than half a parsec away would disrupt the bow shock. It is still speculated that the two stars may have a common origin.
