= NGC 4361 =

Planetary nebula in the constellation Corvus

Emission nebula
- Planetary nebula
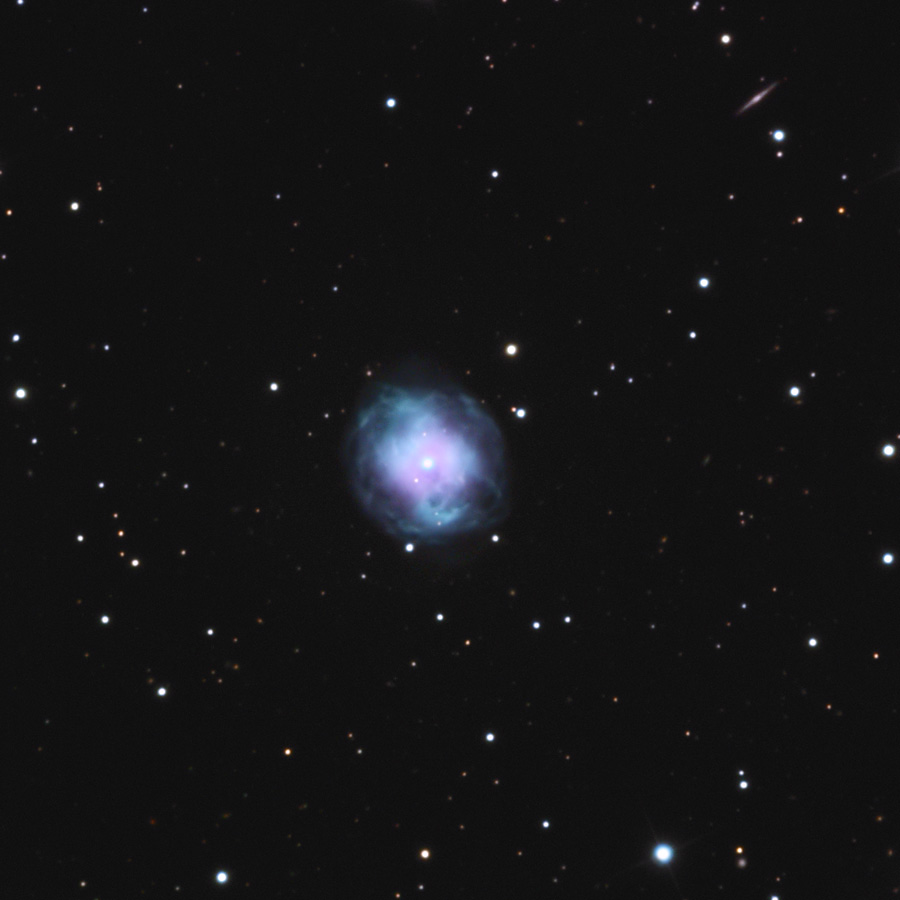
- NGC 4361 imaged with a 24-inch telescope

Observation data: J2000 epoch
- Right ascension: 12^{h} 24^{m} 30.8^{s}
- Declination: −18° 47′ 5.6″
- Distance: 3,377.2±153.6 ly
- Apparent magnitude (V): 10.9
- Apparent dimensions (V): 1.3' x 1.3'
- Constellation: Corvus
- Designations: NGC 4361, PN G294.1+43.6

NGC 4361 (also known as the Lawn Sprinkler Nebula or Garden Sprinkler Nebula) is a planetary nebula in the constellation Corvus. It is included in the Astronomical League's Herschel 400 Observing Program.

== Central star ==
NGC 4361's central star, which has the Henry Draper Catalogue designation HD 107969, is an extremely hot [WC] Wolf-Rayet type star. Its temperature is 126,000 K. It is nearly 18,000 times brighter than the Sun, but is only 6.1% its size. This star left the asymptotic giant branch between 5,776 and 8,018 years ago.

== Gallery ==
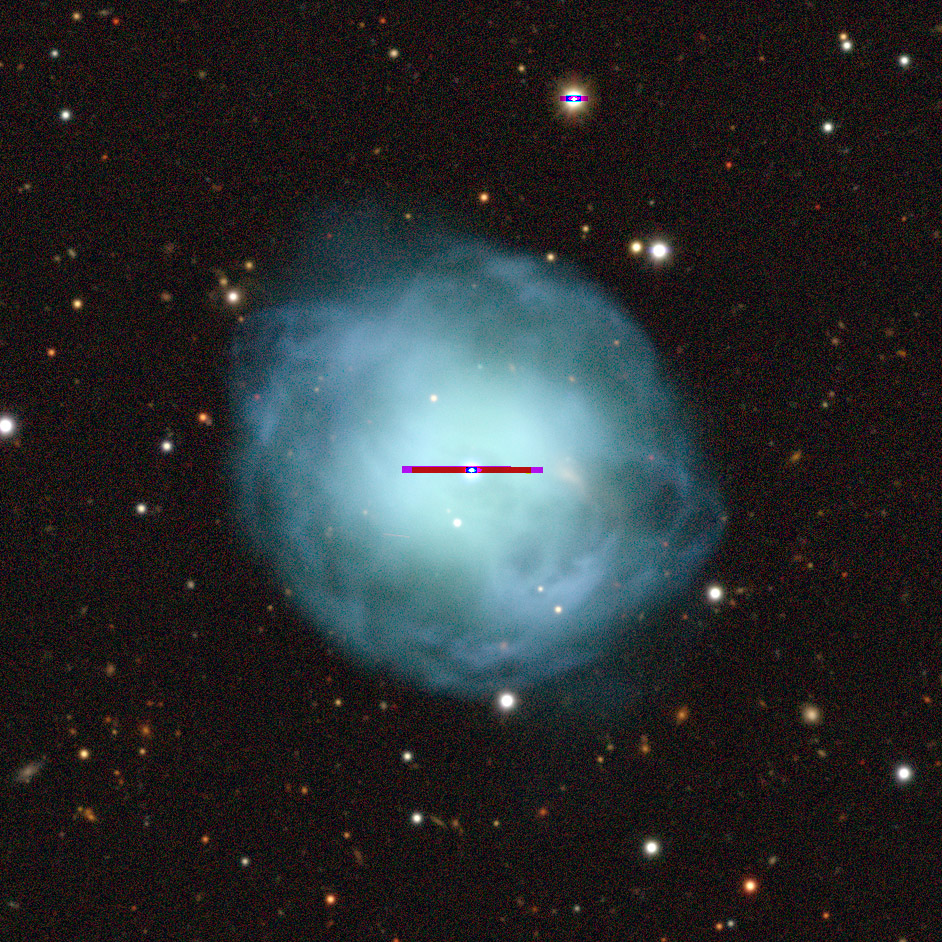
NGC 4361 with legacy surveys

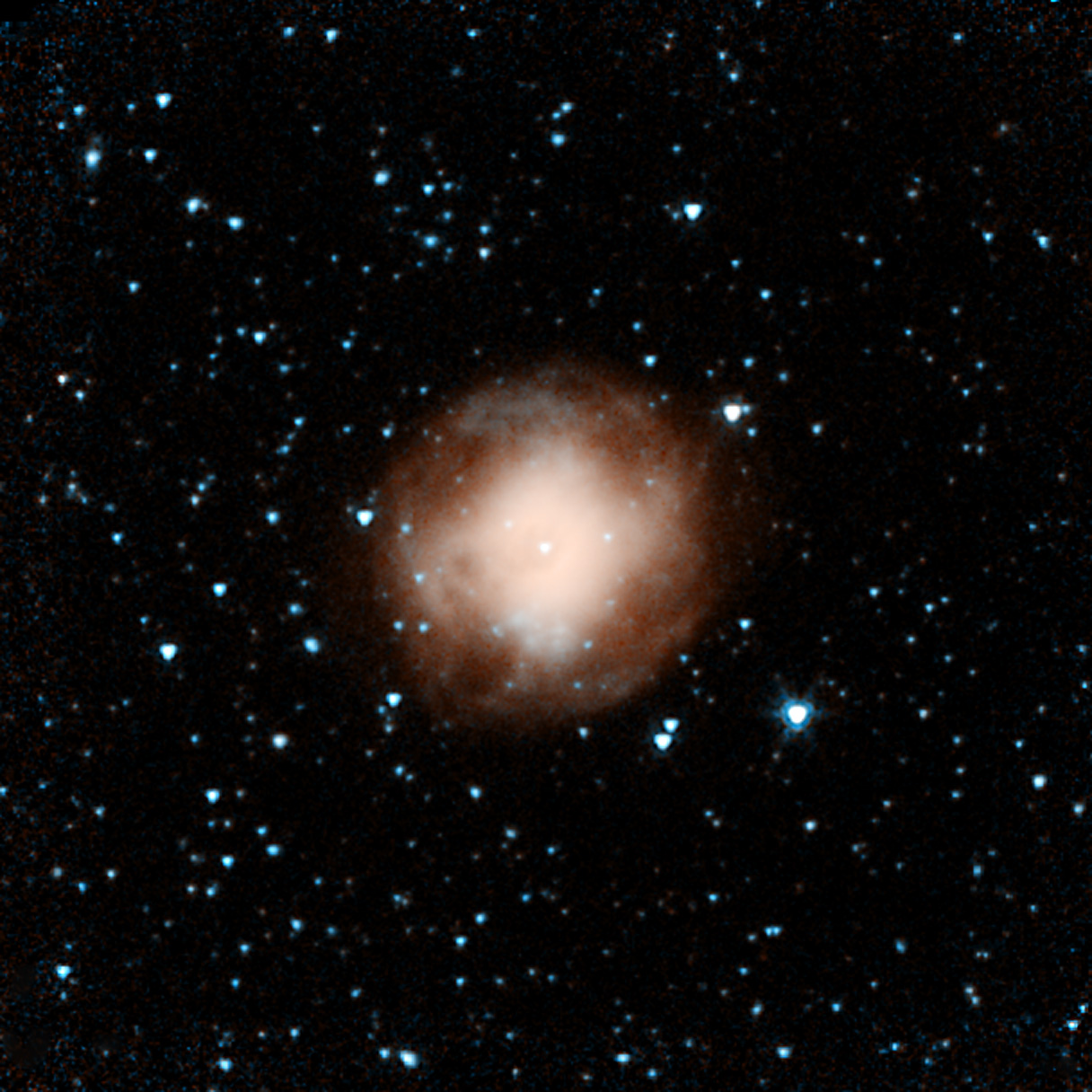
NGC 4361 imaged in infrared by the Spitzer Space Telescope
