= WR 12 =

Star in the constellation Vela

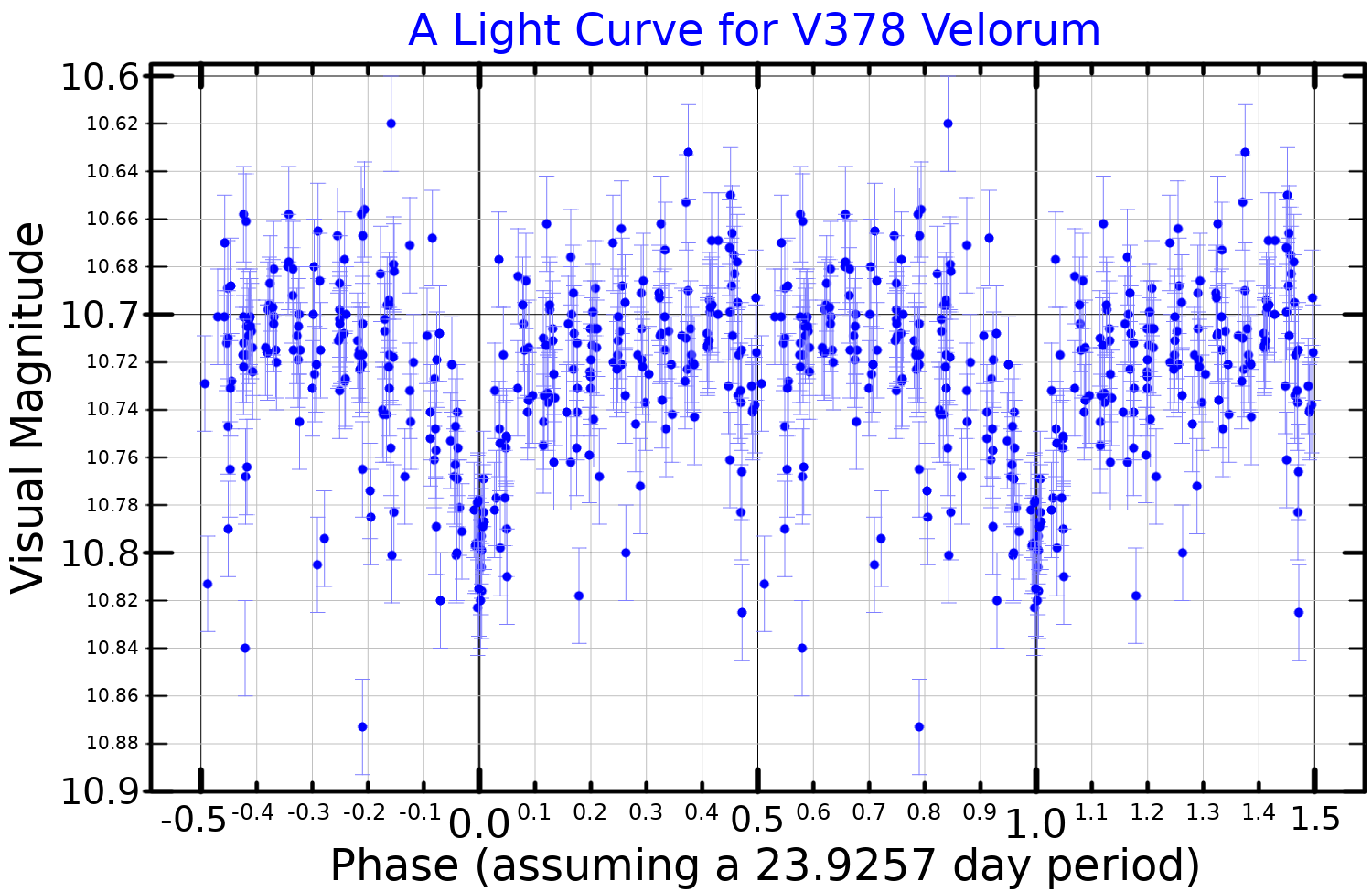
- A visual band light curve for V378 Velorum, plotted from ASAS-SN data

Observation data Epoch J2000 Equinox ICRS
- Constellation: Vela
- Right ascension: 08^{h} 44^{m} 47.290^{s}
- Declination: −45° 58′ 55.42″
- Apparent magnitude (V): 10.78

Characteristics
- Evolutionary stage: Wolf–Rayet
- Spectral type: WN8h
- U−B color index: –0.39
- B−V color index: +0.56
- Variable type: Algol + WR

Astrometry
Proper motion (μ)	RA: −2.979 mas/yr Dec.: +3.777 mas/yr
Parallax (π)	0.1756±0.0129 mas
Distance	19,000 ± 1,000 ly (5,700 ± 400 pc)
Absolute magnitude (M_{V})	−6.68 (−6.5 + −5.5)

Orbit
Period (P)	23.92336±0.00001 d
Eccentricity (e)	0
Inclination (i)	78.8°
Periastron epoch (T)	2,449,811.188±0.065
Semi-amplitude (K_{1}) (primary)	141.9±2.2 km/s

Details

WR
Mass	30 M_{☉}
Radius	16.38 R_{☉}
Luminosity (bolometric)	851,000 L_{☉}
Temperature	44,700 K

Other designations
- WR 12, V378 Velorum, CD−45°4482, 2MASS J08444729-4558554, Hen 3-200

Database references
SIMBAD	data

WR 12 (V378 Velorum) is a spectroscopic binary in the constellation Vela. It is an eclipsing binary consisting of a Wolf–Rayet star and a luminous companion of unknown spectral type. The primary is one of the most luminous stars known.

The spectrum of WR 12 is dominated by the broad emission lines of the primary Wolf–Rayet star. The lowest ionisation nitrogen emission lines are strongest, with NV lines being very weak. The HeI lines are stronger than the HeII lines. Unusually the hydrogen emission is stronger still, leading to a WN8h spectral class. CIV emission is almost undetectable. It has been suggested that the companion is a class O star, but its lines cannot be seen in the spectrum.

Robert Lamontagne et al. announced their discovery that WR 12 is a variable star, in 1996. The system produces eclipses which dim the brightness of the star by 0.12 magnitudes every 24 days. The stars are detached and so it is classified as an Algol-type eclipsing binary. The inclination of the orbit has been estimated at 78.8° but a full orbital solution is not available because the secondary cannot be directly detected.
