= WR 69 =

Star in the constellation Triangulum Australe

Observation data Epoch J2000 Equinox J2000
- Constellation: Triangulum Australe
- Right ascension: 15^{h} 24^{m} 11.31132^{s}
- Declination: −62° 40′ 37.5784″
- Apparent magnitude (V): 9.1

Characteristics
- Evolutionary stage: Wolf-Rayet
- Spectral type: WC9d
- U−B color index: 0.05
- B−V color index: 0.414

Astrometry
Radial velocity (R_{v})	0.00 km/s
Proper motion (μ)	RA: −4.683 mas/yr Dec.: −4.519 mas/yr
Parallax (π)	0.3625±0.0205 mas
Distance	9,000 ± 500 ly (2,800 ± 200 pc)
Absolute magnitude (M_{V})	−5.51

Details
Mass	12.1 M_{☉}
Radius	9.77 R_{☉}
Luminosity	214,000 L_{☉}
Temperature	40,000 K

Other designations
- WR 69, HD 136488, HIP 75377, 2MASS J15241131-6240374

Database references
SIMBAD	data

WR 69 is a Wolf–Rayet star located about 9,000 light years away in the constellation of Triangulum Australe. It is classified as a WC9 star, belonging to the late-type carbon sequence. WR 69 is also a prolific dust producer, hence the "d" in its spectral type.

== Binarity ==
WR 69 has generally been considered to be a binary (WC9d + O) star, with a period of 2.293 days and an amplitude of 0.044 magnitudes, suggesting it could be a short period colliding-wind binary. However, this periodicity is not due binary motion, but due to the fast rotation of the WC9d star, which rotates once every 2.15 days, at 40% of its breakup velocity. The WC9d star is likely part of a much longer binary system, hence the absorption lines found in its spectrum.

== Properties ==
WR 69 is quite average for a WC9 star. Modelling WR 69's spectrum gives a temperature of 40,000 K, and a luminosity of ~214,000 L☉ is derived from the Gaia DR2 parallax. From this a radius can be derived using the Stefan-Boltzmann Law, which turns out at just under 10 R☉. However, in the visual wavelength, the star is just 13,600 L☉ bright, because most of the 214,000 L☉ is emitted in the ultraviolet wavelength. WR 69 has 12.1 solar masses, but it likely started its life with much more than this, and lost much of it through its powerful stellar wind.

WR 69 has a very strong stellar wind, typical of Wolf-Rayet stars. WR 69 loses 10^{−4.87} M☉ (about 1.35×10^{−5} M_{☉}) per year because of this stellar wind, which has a terminal velocity of 1,089 kilometres per second.
