= WR 121-16 =

Star in the constellation of Scutum

Observation data Epoch J2000.0 Equinox J2000.0
- Constellation: Scutum
- Right ascension: 18^{h} 51^{m} 39.7102^{s}
- Declination: −05° 34′ 51.066″
- Apparent magnitude (V): 14.02 (13.95 - 14.14)

Characteristics
- Evolutionary stage: Wolf–Rayet
- Spectral type: WN7o/WC
- Apparent magnitude (J): 11.369
- Apparent magnitude (K): 10.609

Astrometry
Proper motion (μ)	RA: −2.450 mas/yr Dec.: −6.943 mas/yr
Parallax (π)	0.0776±0.0156 mas
Distance	23,190 ly (7,110 pc)
Absolute magnitude (M_{V})	−3.955

Details
Mass	7.1+1.7 −1.1 M_{☉}
Radius	4.14+1.4 −1.3 R_{☉}
Luminosity	75,900+36,300 −22,200 L_{☉}
Temperature	47,000+9,000 −5,000 K

Other designations
- 2MASS J18513970-0534510

Database references
SIMBAD	data

WR 121-16 is a transitional Wolf-Rayet star in the constellation of Scutum, near the Wild Duck Cluster (M11). It is located in the Far 3 kpc Arm of the Milky Way. It is very dim from Earth, having an apparent magnitude of about 14, from being so reddened by interstellar extinction, and its distance of over 23,000 light years. It is one of the dimmest known conventional Wolf-Rayet stars, with a luminosity of less than 76,000 times that of the Sun. WR 121-16 varies irregularly between magnitudes 13.95 and 14.14.

WR 121-16 is a recent addition to the Wolf-Rayet Star Catalogue, being the 667th star added. It was discovered in August 2020.

== Discovery ==
WR 121-16 was originally discovered as a ‘by-product’ of the LAMOST testing observations during the full moon nights, when the telescope was pointing to the open cluster M11, with WR 121-16 being about 42′ 24 apart from the centre of M11.

== Features ==
WR 121-16 is one of a few transitional Wolf-Rayet stars, which display both carbon and nitrogen emission, with a spectral type of WN7o/WC. Modelling the spectrum shows that WR 121-16 is not very luminous at all, with a luminosity of just 75,900 L_{☉}, much less than most Wolf-Rayet stars. WR 121-16 has just over 7 solar masses, nearly all of which is helium. 1.5% of the star is composed of nitrogen, and 0.2% of it is composed of carbon.

Strong stellar winds, typical of Wolf-Rayet stars, with a terminal velocity of 1,000 kilometers per second are causing WR 121-16 to lose 10^{−4.97} M_{☉}/year, much more than the Sun's (2–3)×10^{−14} M_{☉}/year. The winds are so dense that the photosphere of the star is not visible. Its radius is defined for consistency with other Wolf-Rayet stars as being at an optical depth of 20, at about 4 R_{☉}. A "transformed" radius at an optical depth of 2/3, more comparable to other types of star, is at about 6 R_{☉}.
