= M4-18 =

Planetary nebula in the constellation Camelopardalis

Minkowski 4-18
Emission nebula
- Planetary nebula
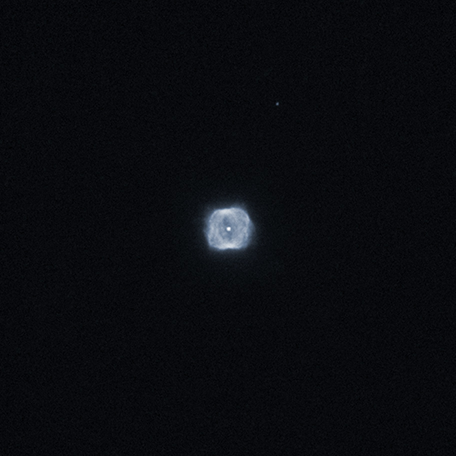
- Photograph of the nebula (Credit: Solomon Hendrix)

Observation data: J2000 epoch
- Right ascension: 04^{h} 25^{m} 50.836^{s}
- Declination: +60° 07′ 12.78″
- Distance: 5230+670 −440 pc
- Apparent magnitude (V): 13.96
- Apparent dimensions (V): 0.063' x 0.063' (3.7")
- Constellation: Camelopardalis

Physical characteristics
- Radius: 0.06 pc
- Designations: PN M 4-18, PN G146.7+07.6, PK 146+07 1

Minkowski 4-18 (M 4-18) is a planetary nebula or protoplanetary nebula in the deep northern constellation of Camelopardalis. Distance estimates range widely across publications between 1–7 kpc, though a 2022 paper gives a distance of 5,230 parsecs (17,100 light-years). The nebula appears to be very young, at about 3,100 years old. Notably, the central star of the nebula is a very cool, late-type Wolf-Rayet star of spectral type [WC11].

== Description ==
M 4-18 Center Star
Characteristics
- Evolutionary stage: Wolf-Rayet star
- Spectral type: [WC11]
- B−V color index: 0.26
- J−H color index: 0.412
- J−K color index: 1.158

Astrometry
Radial velocity (R_{v})	138.3900 km/s
Proper motion (μ)	RA: 0.717 mas/yr Dec.: −0.755 mas/yr
Parallax (π)	0.1528±0.0164 mas
Distance	5230+670 −440 pc

Details
Mass	0.62 (assumed) M_{☉}
Radius	2.4 R_{☉}
Luminosity	5250 L_{☉}
Temperature	31000 K

Other designations
- Gaia DR2 471908436438311680, TIC 148390555, IRAS 04215+6000, 2MASS J04255084+6007127, WISE J042550.85+600712.6

Database references
SIMBAD	data

This object was discovered by German-American astronomer Rudolph Minkowski in 1959. The nebula extends about 0.06 parsecs (0.20 light-years) from its center. As early as 1974, the central star was known to be among the coolest carbon-sequence (type WC) Wolf-Rayet stars. The nebula has a mass of 0.08 M_{☉} and an electron temperature, that is the average kinetic energy of electrons within the plasma, of 8,160 K (7,890 °C; 14,230 °F).

The central star has only 62% the mass of the Sun but is 2.4 times as large. It radiates 5,250 times the luminosity of the Sun from its photosphere at an effective temperature of 31,000 K (30,700 °C; 55,300 °F), according to De Marco & Crowther (1999). Some other sources, such as Acker et al. (2002), find a lower temperature of around 25,000 K.

=== Variability ===
The center star of M 4-18, together with two other objects M 2-54 and NGC 2392, was reported to be a low-amplitude variable in 1996, brightening by 0.03 mag over a 7-hour observation period in the night of 12 December 1995.

=== Reddening ===
The star is reddened substantially at E_{B−V} = 0.75±0.10. The reddening in the ultraviolet region is considered anomalous, as different methods yield very different results for E_{B−V}. This is possibly caused by an undetected shell of circumstellar dust. The infrared reddening profile can be explained by grains of amorphous carbon of a uniform size.

=== Spectra and abundances ===
The central star displays broad emission lines of C^{+}, C^{2+}, and C^{3+} (C II, C III, and C IV in spectroscopic notation), of which the lines of C^{+} are the strongest, consistent with the star's carbon-rich, Wolf-Rayet nature and relatively low effective temperature. The carbon lines overlay the nebula's emission lines, namely neutral hydrogen (H I), as well as the forbidden lines, indicated by the square brackets, of singly ionized nitrogen ([N II]) and sulfur ([S II]). The forbidden line [O III] (O^{2+}; wavelength 4959–5007 Å) is unusually weak, similar to HD 184738 (Campbell's Hydrogen Star). Compared to HD 184738, M 4-18 shows weaker lines of C IV, O IV (O^{3+}), and N V (N^{4+}), implying that atoms in this nebula are in a less excited state.

A 1980 paper claimed that the nebula was deficient in nitrogen and oxygen, but a study in 1995 found a solar-like abundance of carbon, nitrogen, and neon, as well as an oxygen content twice as high as that of the Sun. In contrast, it is very poor in sulfur, only containing 10% as much as the Sun. The reported enrichment in oxygen is dubious, however, as a paper published in 2022 presented a slightly subsolar oxygen abundance. The same paper described an overabundance of xenon.

Weak P Cygni emission features were confirmed in 1984, evidence of stellar winds radiating away from the central star reaching a velocity of approximately 300 km/s.

In 2003, polycyclic aromatic hydrocarbons (PAHs) were detected using infrared spectroscopy. This was independently confirmed in a 2008 paper.
