= WR 119 =

Star in the constellation Scutum

Observation data Epoch J2000 Equinox J2000
- Constellation: Scutum
- Right ascension: 18^{h} 39^{m} 17.904^{s}
- Declination: −10° 50′ 30.90″
- Apparent magnitude (V): 12.06

Characteristics
- Evolutionary stage: Wolf-Rayet
- Spectral type: WC9d
- B−V color index: +0.93

Astrometry
Proper motion (μ)	RA: −1.223 mas/yr Dec.: −5.285 mas/yr
Parallax (π)	0.2098±0.0155 mas
Distance	3,220+1,240 −730 pc
Absolute magnitude (M_{V})	−3.91

Details
Mass	5.8 M_{☉}
Radius	3.7 R_{☉}
Luminosity	50,100 L_{☉}
Temperature	45,000 K

Other designations
- WR 119, 2MASS J18391789-1005309

Database references
SIMBAD	data

WR 119 is a Wolf–Rayet star located about 10,500 light years away in the constellation Scutum. WR 119 is classified as a WC9 star, belonging to the late-type carbon sequence of Wolf-Rayet stars. WR 119 is noteworthy for being the least luminous known Wolf-Rayet star, at just over 50,000 L_{☉}. The most recent estimate is even lower, at just 42,700 L_{☉}, based on the most recent analysis using Gaia DR2 data.

== Properties ==
WR 119's properties are on the very edge of what may be possible for Wolf-Rayet stars, due to being so extremely dim. Modelling its spectrum using PoWR gives a temperature of 45,000 K. Factoring in the distance used in that study of 3,500 pc, WR 119's luminosity is only 50,100 L_{☉}, derived from Gaia DR2's parallax data. The corresponding radius is only 3.7 R_{☉}, the smallest of the WC9 stars, less than half the size of the average WC9 star. WR 119's luminosity is also just 20% that of the average WC9 star's luminosity. The corresponding mass is just 5.8 M_{☉}, the lowest mass for any Wolf-Rayet star derived using a mass-luminosity relation.

In the visual wavelength, the star is also the dimmest of the WC9 stars (and anything later than WC4 in the study), with a visual luminosity of just 3,130 L☉ because most of the 50,100 L_{☉} is emitted at ultraviolet wavelengths due to WR 119's very high surface temperature.

WR 119 has a strong stellar wind, typical of Wolf-Rayet stars, but weaker than most WC stars. WR 119 loses 10^{−5.13} M☉ (about 7.41×10^{−6} M_{☉}) per year because of this stellar wind, which has a terminal velocity of 1,300 kilometres per second. WR 119 also emits a lot of dust, hence the "d" at the end of its spectral type, which may be an indication of binary status.
