= WR 7 =

Star in the constellation Canis Major

HD 56925
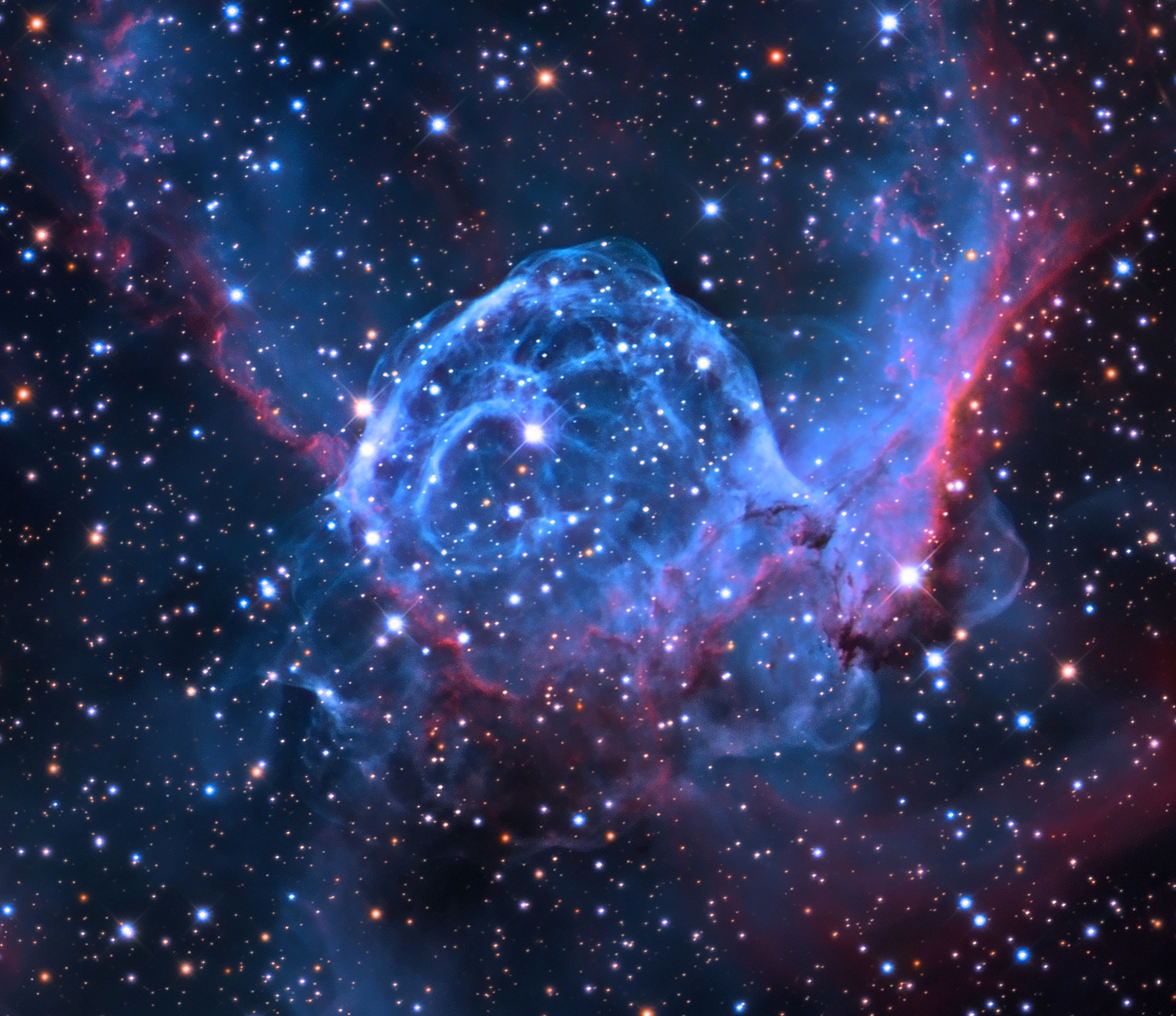
- WR7 at the centre of NGC 2359

Observation data Epoch J2000.0 Equinox J2000.0
- Constellation: Canis Major
- Right ascension: 07^{h} 18^{m} 29.1311^{s}
- Declination: −13° 13′ 01.514″
- Apparent magnitude (V): 11.56

Characteristics
- Evolutionary stage: Wolf–Rayet
- Spectral type: WN4-s
- U−B color index: −0.47
- B−V color index: +0.28

Astrometry
| Proper motion (μ) | RA: −3.601 mas/yr Dec.: −2.998 mas/yr |
| Parallax (π) | 0.2096±0.0268 mas |
| Distance | approx. 16,000 ly (approx. 4,800 pc) |
| Absolute magnitude (M_{V}) | −3.8 |

Details
| Mass | 13 M_{☉} |
| Radius | 1.26 R_{☉} |
| Luminosity | 229,000 L_{☉} |
| Temperature | 112,200 K |

Other designations
- WR 7, HIP 35378, HD 56925, 2MASS J07182912-1313015.

Database references
| SIMBAD | data |

WR 7 (HD 56925) is a Wolf–Rayet star in the constellation of Canis Major. It lies at the centre of a complex bubble of gas which is shocked and partially ionised by the star's radiation and winds.

The distance is uncertain, with estimates between 3.5 kiloparsecs (11,410 light-years) and 6.9 kiloparsecs (22,500 light-years). Assuming a distance of 4.8 kiloparsecs (15,600 light-years), this star is calculated to be 229,000 times brighter than the Sun, 13 times more massive, and 1.26 times larger with a surface temperature of 112,200 K. This makes it currently the second smallest known WN star in the galaxy, after WR 2.

Stars of its kind are characterised by a rapid loss of stellar mass, driven by chemically enriched high-speed stellar winds. It is estimated that it loses mass at the rate of 10^{−5} M_{☉} each year through winds of 1,545 km/s.

The ring nebula NGC 2359 is excited by the ionising radiation of WR7. It is also known as Thor's Helmet or the Duck Nebula. The ring is approximately 4pc across and prominent at wavelengths from radio to X-ray.
