= CV Serpentis =

Binary star system

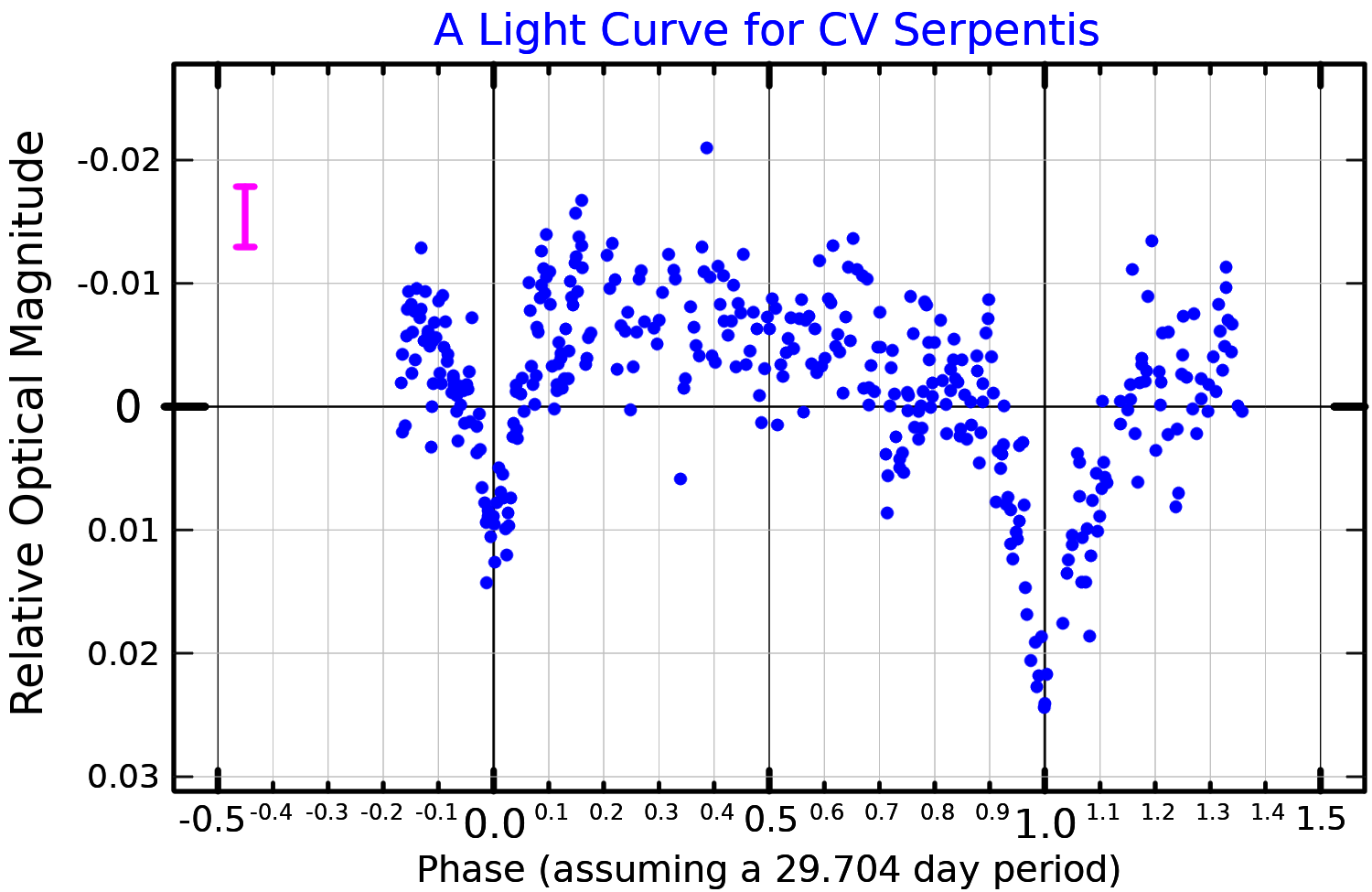
- A broad-band optical light curve for CV Serpentis, adapted from David-Uraz et al. (2012)

Observation data Epoch J2000.0 Equinox J2000.0
- Constellation: Serpens
- Right ascension: 18^{h} 19^{m} 07.363^{s}
- Declination: −11° 37′ 59.16″
- Apparent magnitude (V): 9.08

Characteristics
- Spectral type: WC8d + O8-9IV
- B−V color index: 0.724±0.033
- Variable type: E/D/WR

Astrometry
| Radial velocity (R_{v}) | 17±2 km/s |
| Proper motion (μ) | RA: −0.691 mas/yr Dec.: −1.568 mas/yr |
| Parallax (π) | 0.4896±0.0157 mas |
| Distance | 6,700 ± 200 ly (2,040 ± 70 pc) |
| Absolute magnitude (M_{V}) | System: −5.1±0.8; WR star: −3.6+1.8 −1.3 |

Orbit
| Period (P) | 29.704 d |
| Eccentricity (e) | 0.02±0.02 |
| Inclination (i) | 63.5±2.5° |
| Periastron epoch (T) | 2,455,003±1 HJD |
| Argument of periastron (ω) (secondary) | 330±10° |
| Semi-amplitude (K_{1}) (primary) | 173±1 km/s |

Details

OB star
| Mass | 33.3±2.0 M_{☉} |
| Luminosity | 64,749 L_{☉} |
| Temperature | 27,570 K |
| Rotational velocity (v sin i) | 310-330 km/s |

WR star
| Mass | 11.7±0.9 M_{☉} |
| Luminosity | 24,018 L_{☉} |
| Temperature | 44,500 K |

Other designations
- WR 113, CV Ser, BD−11 4593, HD 168206, HIP 89769, SAO 161325, PPM 234357

Database references
| SIMBAD | data |

CV Serpentis is a binary star system in the equatorial constellation of Serpens. It is a detached eclipsing binary with an orbital period of 29.7 days. The system includes a Wolf–Rayet (WR) star with the identifier WR 113. The system is located at a distance of approximately 6,700 light years from the Sun based on parallax measurements. It is a member of the Serpens OB2 association of co-moving stars.

In 1892, this star was found to be an object of interest based on photographs of its peculiar stellar spectra taken from the Boyden Station in Arequipa, Peru. It was determined to be a carbon-type Wolf–Rayet (WR) star and in 1945 was found to be a spectroscopic binary system by W. A. Hiltner. This system was reported to be an eclipsing binary by S. Gaposchkin in 1949, who found a decrease in brightness of 0.14 magnitude during the first eclipse and 0.08 in the second. R. M. Hjellming and W. A. Hiltner in 1963 measured a much deeper primary eclipse with a decrease of about 0.55 magnitude, then in 1970 K. Stępień saw no evidence of eclipsing. L. V. Kuhi and F. Schweizer confirmed this latter result, hypothesizing that it is the result of a changing Wolf-Rayet envelope.

This is a double-lined spectroscopic binary system in a near circular orbit, meaning that the spectra of both components is visible. The companion of the WR star is a massive OB star with a stellar classification of O8-9IV. A nebulous double-shell centered on CV Ser was discovered in 1984, spanning angular diameters of 4′ and 9′. The diffuse outer ring is incomplete, spanning a radius of 5.4 pc at an approximate distance of two kiloparsecs. Variations in the system's light curve continued to be observed, suggesting changes in the outflow from the Wolf-Rayet star. An emission feature in the spectrum of the system was interpreted as a region between the two stars where their stellar winds are colliding, forming a shock region of plasma.

The system is expected to evolve into a binary with the OB-star and an 8 M_{☉} black hole following a failed supernova where the WR star collapses with little or no visible explosion. The OB star is observed to be rotating rapidly at between 310 and 330 km/s using spectral lines of neutral helium. Observations using ionized helium absorption lines show a lower velocity, interpreted as showing an oblate shape with gravity darkening causing lower temperatures at the equator.

Speckle interferometry has found a companion star 1.16″ from the bright primary and eight magnitudes fainter. The projected separation of 2,200 AU is much larger than the maximum possible 129 AU separation of the Wolf-Rayet and OB pair. If it is found to be at the same distance as the bright spectroscopic pair, it would likely be an F-type main sequence star in an orbit with a period around 100,000 years and the lowest-luminosity known companion of any WR star at 5 L_{☉}.
