= Markarian 50 =

Open cluster in the constellation Cepheus

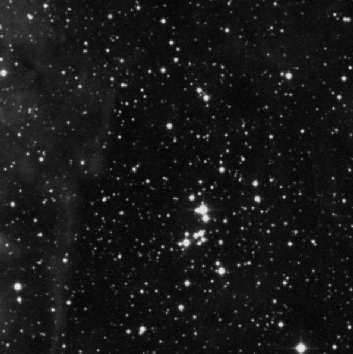

Observation data (J2000 epoch)
- Right ascension: 23^{h} 15^{m} 13.4^{s}
- Declination: +60° 26′ 53″
- Distance: 3,460 pc
- Absolute magnitude (V): 8.5

Physical characteristics
- Estimated age: 7.5 million years
- Other designations: Cl Basel 3, Cl Mrk 50, OCISM 56, MWSC 3712, C 2313+602, Cl Biurakan 3, OCl 257

Associations
- Constellation: Cepheus

Markarian 50 is a young open cluster in the Milky Way galaxy. Located at about 3,460 pc away in the constellation Cepheus, its age is estimated at only about 7.5 million years old. Markarian 50 may be a member of the OB association Cassiopeia OB2. The Wolf–Rayet star WR 157 is a member of Markarian 50.

Markarian 50 can also refer to a Seyfert galaxy in the constellation Virgo.

Prominent stars
Star name	Effective temperature	Absolute magnitude	Bolometric magnitude	Mass (M_{☉})	Spectral type
HD 219460 A	30200	−4.7	−7.7	21	B0III
WR 157 (Companion to HD 219460 A)	65000			20	WN4.5
Mrk50-31	28200	−4.6	−7.4	19	B0.5I
Mrk50-23	23600	−4.5	−6.7	14	B1III
Mrk50-30A	22400	−3.6	−5.7	11	B1.5V
Mrk50-1	22400	−2.8	−4.8	9	B1.5V
