= WR 46 =

Star in the constellation Crux

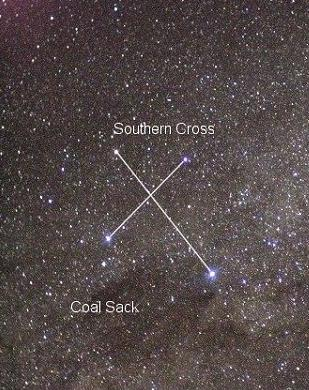
- WR 46 (location circled) in the constellation Crux

Observation data Epoch J2000 Equinox J2000
- Constellation: Crux
- Right ascension: 12^{h} 05^{m} 18.72028^{s}
- Declination: −62° 03′ 10.1280″
- Apparent magnitude (V): 10.83

Characteristics
- Evolutionary stage: Wolf–Rayet
- Spectral type: WN3p-w
- U−B color index: -0.84
- B−V color index: -0.03
- Variable type: Irregular

Astrometry
Radial velocity (R_{v})	4.00 km/s
Proper motion (μ)	RA: -5.625 mas/yr Dec.: 0.304 mas/yr
Parallax (π)	0.3501±0.0343 mas
Distance	9,300 ± 900 ly (2,900 ± 300 pc)
Absolute magnitude (M_{V})	−2.56

Details
Mass	14 M_{☉}
Radius	1.36 R_{☉}
Luminosity	263,000 L_{☉}
Temperature	112,200 K

Other designations
- HD 104994, HIP 58954, DI Crucis, CD-61°3331, GSC 08978-02316, 2MASS J12051871-6203101, AAVSO 1200-61

Database references
SIMBAD	data

WR 46 (DI Crucis) is a Wolf–Rayet star in the constellation of the Southern Cross of apparent magnitude +10.8. It is located at 55 arcmin north of Theta^{2} Crucis. The star is a member of the distant stellar association Cru OB4, and is around 2,900 parsecs or 9,300 light years from the Solar System.

== Features ==
WR 46 has spectral type WN3, with peculiarities in the spectrum including unusually broad emission lines. Its spectrum is characterized by the presence of strong lines of N_{V} and He_{II} and the absence of hydrogen lines. It is known as a weak-lined WNE star because of the high temperature but relatively weak emission strength.

The physical parameters of WR 46 are all estimates from assumptions about the distance and models for stars of its type, complicated by the suspicion that there is a companion star. The effective temperature is over 110,000K, the luminosity greater than 200,000 times the solar luminosity (L_{☉}), the mass around 14 times that of the Sun (M_{☉}) and a radius of 1.36 times the solar radius (R_{☉}). The terminal velocity of the stellar wind reaches 2450 km/s with a total mass loss rate of 4 × 10^{−6} M_{☉} per year.

WR 46 is a known source of X-rays, an aspect that was discovered by the Einstein Observatory. The X-ray luminosity between 0.2 and 10.0 keV is 7.7 × 10^{32} erg/s. Its X-ray spectrum is dominated by a soft component but there is also a hard component above 3 keV (a hard tail).

== Variability ==
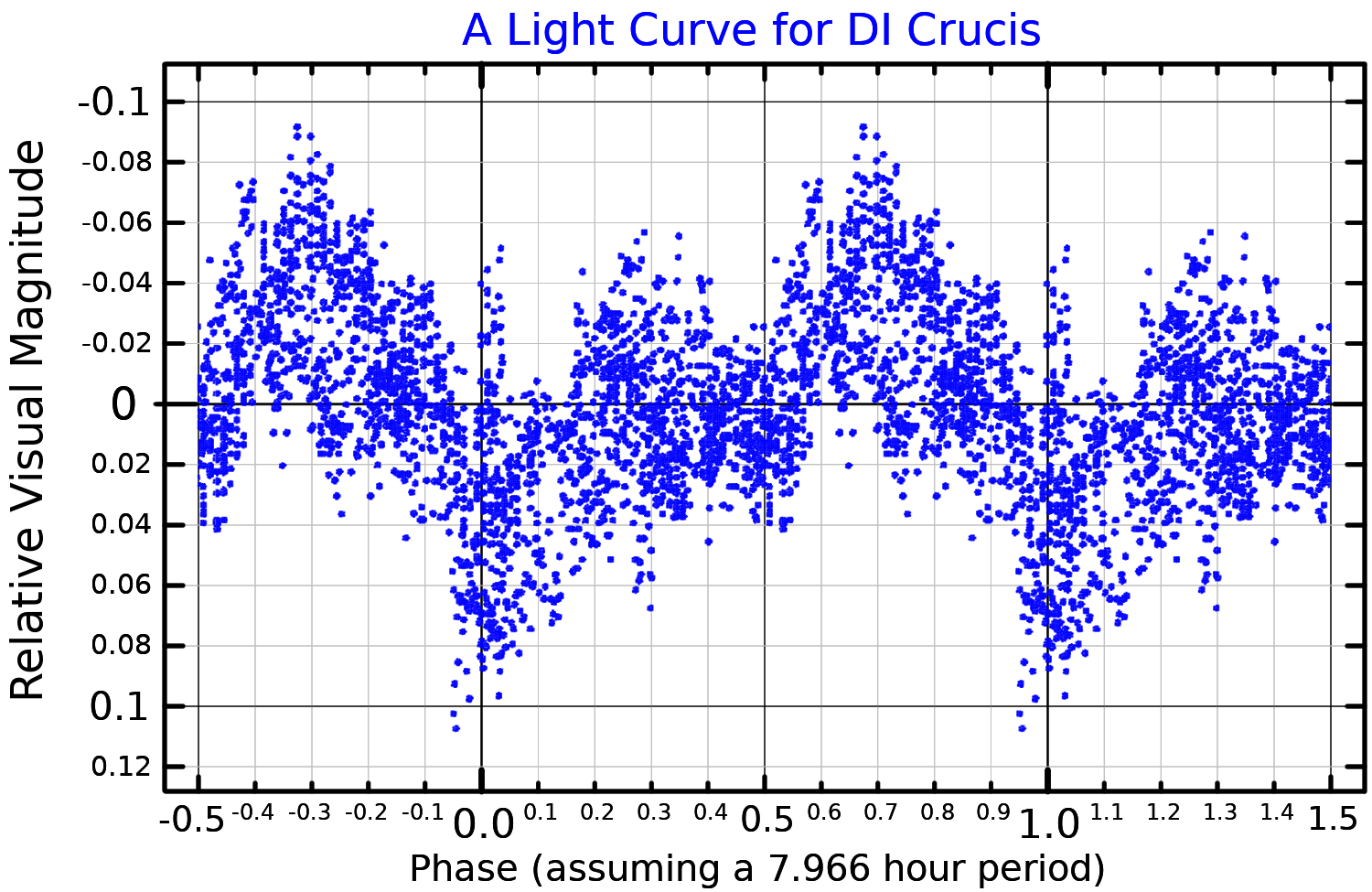
A visual band light curve for DI Crucis, adapted from Oliveira et al. (2004)

WR 46 exhibits complex variability on relatively short time scales of a few hours. In the past there have been regular but intermittent changes in the radial velocity, multiple periods and photometric variation at some wavelengths, particularly ultraviolet. It has been proposed that this short-term behavior is due to non-radial pulsations, fast rotational modulation, or the presence of a lower-mass companion. Theories that are now discounted include WR 46 being a Super soft X-ray source or a V Sagittae star,

The radial velocity changes of the spectral lines originating most deeply within the stellar wind show clear radial velocity variations with a period of 7.9 hours. However the lines do not change their shape or intensity, which would be expected from a pulsating star Non-radial pulsations have been proposed, with multiple pulsation periods of varying amplitude accounting for the apparently irregular brightness changes.

== Binary star ==
WR 46 has been suspected to be a binary system with an OB companion. The orbital period of the system has been reported at 0.311 days and 0.329 days. Most recent research refutes the idea of a companion, instead favoring the single WN star theory.
