= WR 9 =

Spectroscopic binary star system in the constellation Puppis

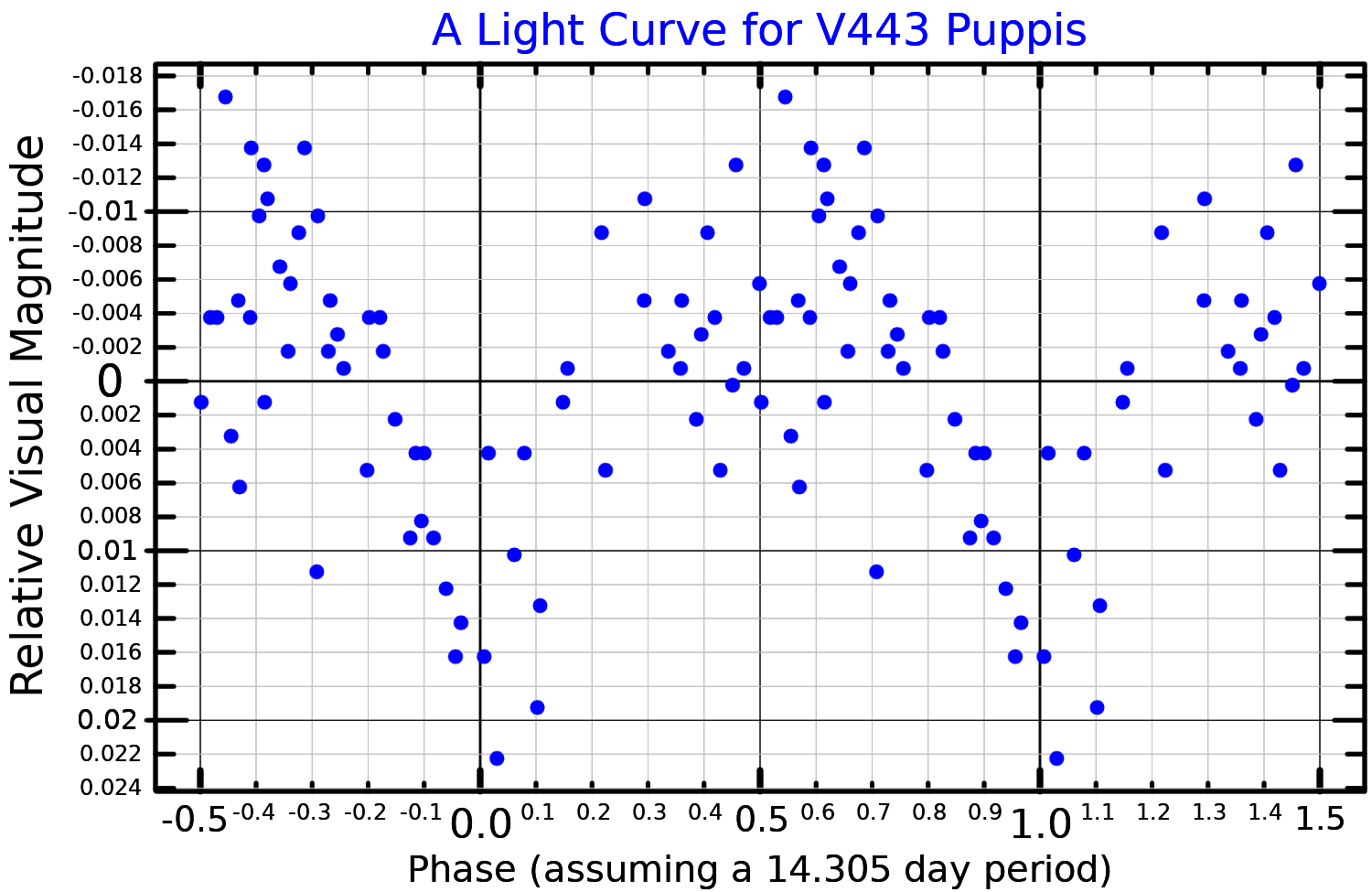
- A visual band light curve for V443 Puppis, plotted from data published by Lamontagne et al. (1996)

Observation data Epoch J2000.0 Equinox J2000.0
- Constellation: Puppis
- Right ascension: 07^{h} 45^{m} 50.3992^{s}
- Declination: −34° 19′ 48.500″
- Apparent magnitude (V): 10.50

Characteristics
- Spectral type: WC4 + O7
- Apparent magnitude (J): 8.452
- Apparent magnitude (K): 7.545
- U−B color index: +0.04
- B−V color index: +0.93
- Variable type: Eclipsing + WR

Astrometry
| Radial velocity (R_{v}) | 321 ± 12 km/s |
| Proper motion (μ) | RA: −2.159 mas/yr Dec.: +3.175 mas/yr |
| Parallax (π) | 0.2717±0.0137 mas |
| Distance | 12,000 ± 600 ly (3,700 ± 200 pc) |
| Absolute magnitude (M_{V}) | WR: −3.34; O: −4.01 |

Orbit
| Period (P) | 14.305 |
| Semi-major axis (a) | 123 R_{☉} |
| Eccentricity (e) | 0 |
| Inclination (i) | 55±34° |
| Semi-amplitude (K_{1}) (primary) | 186±19 km/s |
| Semi-amplitude (K_{2}) (secondary) | 56±28 km/s |

Details

WR
| Mass | 9 M_{☉} |
| Radius | 5 R_{☉} |
| Luminosity | 500,000 L_{☉} |
| Temperature | 139,700 K |

O
| Mass | 32 M_{☉} |

Other designations
- V443 Puppis, CD−34°3879, HD 63099, HIP 37876

Database references
| SIMBAD | data |

WR 9 is a spectroscopic binary in the constellation Puppis consisting of a Wolf-Rayet star and a class O star. It is around 12,000 light years away.

WR 9 is a binary with two components in a circular 14-day orbit. The Wolf-Rayet component is often identified as the primary because it dominates the spectrum with its broad emission lines, although it is less massive, less luminous, and less visually bright than its companion. The companion is an approximately O7 star.

The spectrum is dominated by broad emission lines, those of C_{IV} being the strongest, followed by He_{II}. C_{III} lines are seen but much weaker. O_{V} lines are also stronger than C_{III}. The classification is usually given as WC4, although it has previously been assigned as WC5. By comparison, the absorption lines of the secondary star are narrower and weaker, although at blue and shorter wavelengths they become stronger than the WR lines. The spectral type of the secondary can be set at O7. The luminosity class cannot be determined clearly, although it has been suggested to be a supergiant. The Wolf-Rayet star shows no hydrogen in its spectrum and is thought to be hydrogen-free. It is calculated to consist of 42% helium and 58% heavier elements, mostly carbon and oxygen.

WR 9 is listed as an eclipsing binary in the General Catalogue of Variable Stars, as well as having the more irregular brightness changes frequently seen in Wolf Rayet stars. The total amplitude is only 0.04 magnitudes. The eclipses are so shallow because only the atmosphere of the WR star eclipses the O star on each orbit.
