= BAT99-123 =

Wolf-Rayet star in the constellation Dorado

Observation data Epoch J2000 Equinox ICRS
- Constellation: Dorado
- Right ascension: 05^{h} 39^{m} 34.302^{s}
- Declination: −68° 44′ 09.16″
- Apparent magnitude (V): 15.204

Characteristics
- Evolutionary stage: Wolf–Rayet
- Spectral type: WO3
- U−B color index: −1.335
- B−V color index: 0.422

Astrometry
| Proper motion (μ) | RA: 1.718 mas/yr Dec.: 0.876 mas/yr |
| Parallax (π) | −0.0198±0.055 mas |
| Distance | 50,000 pc |

Details
| Mass | 7.7 M_{☉} |
| Radius | 0.47 R_{☉} |
| Luminosity | 158,500 L_{☉} |
| Temperature | 170,000 K |

Other designations
- Brey 93, 2MASS J05393430-6844091

Database references
| SIMBAD | data |

BAT99-123, also known as Brey 93, is a rare WO-type (oxygen sequence) Wolf–Rayet star located in the Large Magellanic Cloud, about 160,000 light years away in Dorado. BAT99-123 was the first WO star discovered in the LMC, and only 3 are known to exist in the galaxy, the other two being LH 41-1042 and LMC195-1.

BAT99-123 was first discovered in 1970, and identified as a star with strong O_{VI} emission in 1971, alongside other WO stars like WR 102, WR 142 and SMC AB8. Most stars with strong OVI emission known at the time were central stars of planetary nebulae.

== Properties ==
Analysis of BAT99-123's spectrum reveals a surface temperature of 170,000 K. Assuming a distance of 50.12 kpc, or about 163,500 light years, BAT99-123's luminosity is about 158,500 L_{☉}, corresponding to a radius of 0.47 R_{☉}. BAT99-123's strong stellar wind, which has a very high terminal velocity of 3300 km/s, causes it to lose 10^{−5.14} M☉ (about 7.24×10^{−6} M_{☉}) a year.

WO-type Wolf-Rayet stars are very very close to the end of their lives. BAT99-123 is predicted to explode in a type Ic supernova in about 7,000 years. By then, it's predicted to have a mass of 7.7 M☉, much lower than its initial mass which was likely a few dozen solar masses. It likely has a similar mass right now as its stellar wind will not change the mass much in this timescale.
