= BAT99-7 =

Wolf-Rayet star in the constellation Dorado

Observation data Epoch J2000 Equinox ICRS
- Constellation: Dorado
- Right ascension: 04^{h} 55^{m} 34.3416^{s}
- Declination: −67° 30′ 02.683″
- Apparent magnitude (V): 13.81

Characteristics
- Evolutionary stage: Wolf–Rayet
- Spectral type: WN4b
- U−B color index: −0.567
- B−V color index: −0.35

Astrometry
Proper motion (μ)	RA: 1.733 mas/yr Dec.: 0.367 mas/yr
Parallax (π)	−0.0083±0.0166 mas
Distance	50,000 pc
Absolute magnitude (M_{V})	−5.02

Details
Mass	25 M_{☉}
Radius	1.1 R_{☉}
Luminosity	692,000 L_{☉}
Temperature	158,500 K
Rotational velocity (v sin i)	160 km/s

Other designations
- Brey 6, HD 32109, 2MASS J04553134-6730028

Database references
SIMBAD	data

BAT99-7 is a WN-type Wolf-Rayet star located in the Large Magellanic Cloud, in the constellation of Dorado, about 160,000 light years away. The star has a spectrum containing extremely broad emission lines, and is the prototype for the "round line" stars, Wolf-Rayet stars whose spectra are characterized by strong and broad emission lines with round line profiles. The broad emission lines hint at an extremely high temperature of nearly 160,000 Kelvin, which would make it the hottest of all WN stars with known temperatures, as well as an extraordinarily large mass loss rate for a Wolf-Rayet star in the LMC, at 10^{−4.48} M_{☉}/yr, which means that every 30,200 years, the star loses 1 solar mass worth of mass.
