= NGC 6822-WR 12 =

Star in the constellation Sagittarius

NGC 6822 WR-12
Observation data Epoch J2000 Equinox ICRS
- Constellation: Sagittarius
- Right ascension: 19^{h} 45^{m} 13.5^{s}
- Declination: −14° 45′ 13″
- Apparent magnitude (V): 18.96

Characteristics
- Evolutionary stage: Wolf–Rayet
- Spectral type: WN4
- U−B color index: -0.54
- B−V color index: -0.17

Astrometry
Distance	472,000 pc
Absolute magnitude (M_{V})	−5.41

Details
Mass	36 M_{☉}
Radius	3.77 R_{☉}
Luminosity	1,288,000 L_{☉}
Temperature	100,000 K

Other designations
- LGGS J194513.50-144512.9

Database references
SIMBAD	data

NGC 6822-WR 12 is a WN-type Wolf–Rayet star located in the galaxy NGC 6822, about 1.54 million light years away in the constellation of Sagittarius. NGC 6822-WR 12 was the first Wolf–Rayet star to be discovered in the galaxy, and is one of only four known in the galaxy.

== Discovery ==
In 1983, a Wolf–Rayet (WR) star was identified in the barred irregular galaxy NGC 6822. The appearance of strong ionised helium emission lines in its spectrum, together with ionised nitrogen emission lines but no carbon lines, led to the assignment of the spectral class WN3. At the time, it was the only known WR star in NGC 6822.

NGC 6822-WR 12 was the 12th candidate of 12 candidate WR stars found in NGC 6822 during a survey of NGC 6822 and IC 1613. In a follow-up study, only 4 of the WR candidates in NGC 6822 were confirmed as WR stars, and they are still the only WR stars known in NGC 6822.

== Properties ==
High-resolution spectroscopy of NGC 6822-WR 12 gives a spectral type of WN4 and CMFGEN atmosphere models give a very high temperature of 100,000 K. Combined with a radius of 3.77 R_{☉}, this leads to a bolometric luminosity of 1.3 million L_{☉}, which would likely make it one of the most luminous stars in its relatively small galaxy. Assuming mass-luminosity relations for Wolf–Rayet stars points to a very high mass, about 36 solar masses. NGC 6822-WR 12 has a powerful stellar wind, which ejects 10^{−4.6} M_{☉} per year from its surface at a relatively slow speed of 1,100 kilometres per second.

=== Composition ===
As is typical of WN stars, NGC 6822-WR 12 has almost no hydrogen, it having been either fused to helium or lost through strong stellar winds. However, due to the very low metallicity of NGC 6822, similar to that of the Small Magellanic Cloud, it has a lower nitrogen abundance than that of galactic WN stars, containing just 0.3% nitrogen. The emission lines of ionised nitrogen in the spectrum are correspondingly weak. The rest of the star is helium and its spectrum is dominated by emission lines of ionised helium.
