= WR 1 =

Star in the constellation Cassiopeia

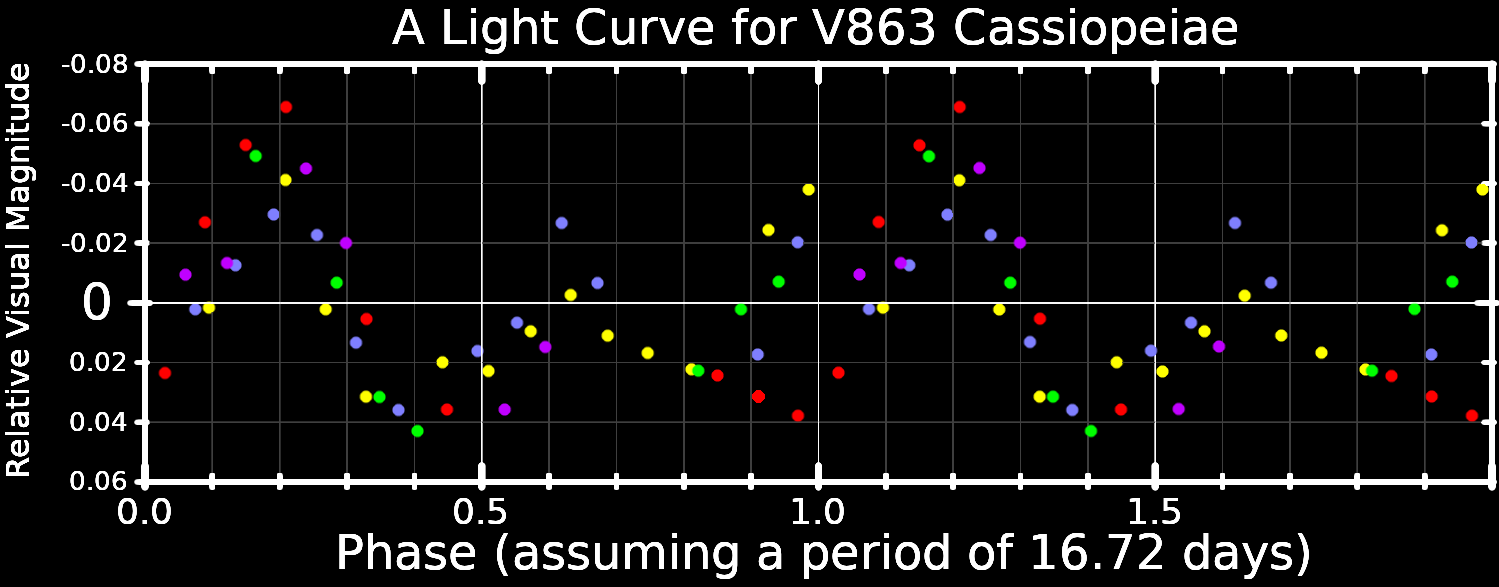
- A visual band light curve for V863 Cassiopeiae, adapted from Chené et al. (2008). The data were taken from November 2003 to February 2004, and different cycles are shown with different colors.

Observation data Epoch J2000 Equinox ICRS
- Constellation: Cassiopeia
- Right ascension: 00^{h} 43^{m} 28.39717^{s}
- Declination: +64° 45′ 35.3847″
- Apparent magnitude (V): 10.54

Characteristics
- Evolutionary stage: Wolf–Rayet
- Spectral type: WN4-s
- U−B color index: −0.24
- B−V color index: +0.37
- Variable type: WR

Astrometry
| Proper motion (μ) | RA: −2.878 mas/yr Dec.: −0.702 mas/yr |
| Parallax (π) | 0.3092±0.0139 mas |
| Distance | 10,500 ± 500 ly (3,200 ± 100 pc) |
| Absolute magnitude (M_{V}) | −4.9 |

Details
| Mass | 27 M_{☉} |
| Radius | 2.26 R_{☉} |
| Luminosity | 760,000 L_{☉} |
| Temperature | 112,200 K |
| Rotational velocity (v sin i) | 6.5 km/s |

Other designations
- V863 Cas, BD+63°83, HD 4004, HIP 3415

Database references
| SIMBAD | data |

WR 1 is a Wolf–Rayet star located around 10,300 light years away from Earth in the constellation of Cassiopeia. It is only slightly more than twice the size of the sun, but due to a temperature over 100,000 K it is over 758,000 times as luminous as the sun.

Although WR 1 has been recognised as a Wolf–Rayet star since the 19th century, the WR 1 designation does not indicate that it was the first to be discovered. Ordered by right ascension, WR 1 is the first star in the Seventh Catalogue of galactic Wolf–Rayet stars.

WR 1 is a member of the nitrogen sequence of WR stars and has a spectrum with He_{II} lines much stronger than He_{I} lines, and N_{V} emission more than twice the strength of N_{III}, leading to the assignment of a WN4 spectral type. The spectrum has particularly wide He_{II}, leading to the equivalent classifications of WN4-b (for broad) or WN4-s (for strong). The spectrum also includes C_{IV} and N_{IV}, but no hydrogen lines at all, indicating that WR 1 has already expelled all of its hydrogen through its powerful stellar wind.

In 1986, Anthony F. J. Moffat and Michael M. Shara announced their discovery that WR 1 is a variable star. It was given its variable star designation, V863 Cassiopeiae, in 2001. The total amplitude of the variations is only 0.09 magnitudes at visual wavelengths. The variations are well-defined with a period of 16.9 days, but the light curve is not sinusoidal and its shape may vary. The variations have been ascribed to a dense asymmetric stellar wind and co-rotating interacting regions in ejected material.

It has been suggested that the variability and an infrared excess could be due to a cool companion, but WR 1 is now considered to be a single star. The WN-b subclass of Wolf–Rayet star are generally thought to be all single, in contrast with the WN-A subclass which have narrow emission on a stronger continuum and are thought to be binary systems with a more conventional hot luminous star.

WR 1 is a possible member of the Cassiopeia OB7 association at a distance of around 1,800 pc, although its Gaia parallax suggests it is more distant. Interstellar extinction is calculated to be 2.1 magnitudes, and at 1,820 pc the bolometric luminosity would be 758,600 L_{☉}. A temperature of 112,200 K is derived from fitting the spectrum, giving a radius of 2.26 R_{☉}.
