= WR 2 =

Wolf–Rayet star in the constellation Cassiopeia

Observation data Epoch J2000 Equinox ICRS
- Constellation: Cassiopeia
- Right ascension: 01^{h} 05^{m} 23.03092^{s}
- Declination: +60° 25′ 18.9001″
- Apparent magnitude (V): 11.33

Characteristics
- Evolutionary stage: Wolf–Rayet
- Spectral type: WN2-w
- B−V color index: +0.16

Astrometry
Proper motion (μ)	RA: −3.362 mas/yr Dec.: −1.416 mas/yr
Parallax (π)	0.2483±0.2859 mas
Distance	2,510 pc
Absolute magnitude (M_{V})	−2.43

Details
Mass	16 M_{☉}
Radius	0.89 R_{☉}
Luminosity	282,000 L_{☉}
Temperature	141,000 K
Rotational velocity (v sin i)	500 km/s
Age	4.0 Myr

Other designations
- HD 6327, WR 2, HIP 5100

Database references
SIMBAD	data

WR 2 is a Wolf–Rayet star located around 8,000 light years away from Earth in the constellation of Cassiopeia, in the stellar association Cassiopeia OB1. It is smaller than the Sun, but due to a temperature over 140,000 K it is 282,000 times as luminous as the Sun. With a radius of 89% that of the Sun, it is the smallest known WN star in the Milky Way.

WR 2 is considered to be a member of the nitrogen sequence of WR stars, but completely lacks lines of N_{III}, N_{IV}, N_{V}, and He_{I}. Its spectrum is dominated by broad rounded emission lines of He_{II}, leading to the classification of WN2-b (for broad). It is now given the spectral type of WN2-w (for weak), due to the relative strength of the continuum and lack of extremely intense emission lines. It is the only galactic WN2 star known. Weak-lined Wolf–Rayet stars often have hot luminous companions which dilute the emission. WR 2 does have a companion, but it is much fainter than the primary and not thought to be the cause of the weak-lined spectrum.

WR 2 is the smallest and hottest WN star known in the galaxy. Its unusual rounded emission lines are thought to be due to extremely fast rotation, although the exact rotation rate is not known. Estimates range from 500 km/s to approximately the breakup rate for the star of 1,900 km/s. The high temperature also leads to a very fast stellar wind of 1,800 km/s, although the overall rate of mass loss is one of the lowest for any Wolf–Rayet star. The combination of a massive Wolf–Rayet star and rapid rotation is likely to result in a gamma-ray burst when the star explodes as a supernova.

X-rays have been detected from WR 2 although they may not be due to colliding winds as is common for massive stars.
