= WR 135 =

Star in the constellation Cygnus

Observation data Epoch J2000 Equinox ICRS
- Constellation: Cygnus
- Right ascension: 20^{h} 11^{m} 53.52729^{s}
- Declination: +36° 11′ 50.5323″
- Apparent magnitude (V): 8.11 (8.06 - 8.16)

Characteristics
- Evolutionary stage: Wolf-Rayet
- Spectral type: WC8
- U−B color index: −0.36
- B−V color index: +0.02
- Variable type: WR

Astrometry
Proper motion (μ)	RA: −2.635 mas/yr Dec.: −6.081 mas/yr
Parallax (π)	0.4746±0.0326 mas
Distance	1,980+180 −150 pc
Absolute magnitude (M_{V})	−4.78

Details
Mass	13.6 M_{☉}
Radius	4.24 R_{☉}
Luminosity	250,000 L_{☉}
Temperature	63,000 K

Other designations
- V1042 Cygni, WR 135, HD 192103, HIP 99525, BD+35°4013, CCDM J20119+3612, WDS J20119+3612

Database references
SIMBAD	data

WR 135 is a variable Wolf–Rayet star located around 6,000 light years away from Earth in the constellation of Cygnus, surrounded by a faint bubble nebula blown by the intense radiation and fast wind from the star. It is just over four times the radius of the sun, but due to a temperature of 63,000 K it is 250,000 times as luminous as the sun.

WR 135, together with WR 134 and WR 137, was one of three stars in Cygnus observed in 1867 to have unusual spectra consisting of intense emission lines rather than the more normal continuum and absorption lines. These were the first members of the class of stars that came to be called Wolf–Rayet stars (WR stars) after Charles Wolf and Georges Rayet who discovered their unusual appearance. It is a member of the carbon sequence of WR stars, indicated by the lack of nitrogen lines and the strength of carbon emission. WR 135 has a spectrum with CIII emission slightly stronger than CIV, leading to the assignment of a WC8 spectral type. The spectrum also shows strong HeI emission and weaker lines of HeII and CII.

WR 135 is less than a degree away from WR 134 and the two are believed to lie at approximately the same distance from Earth within the Cygnus OB3 association. Both stars lie within a shell of hydrogen thought to have been swept up from the interstellar medium when one or both stars were on the main sequence. The shell is over forty parsecs wide and contains about 1,830 M_{☉} of hydrogen. It is unclear which of the two stars is primarily responsible for creating the shell.

WR 135 has two close companions. HD 228235 is an 11th magnitude star 53" away and there is also a 12th magnitude star 41" away.
