= Fernand Courty =

French astronomer (1862–1921)

Minor planets discovered: 2
384 Burdigala	11 February 1894	MPC
387 Aquitania	5 March 1894	MPC

Fernand Courty (11 June 1862 – 12 October 1921) was a French astronomer and a discoverer of minor planets.

He joined Bordeaux Observatory when it was founded in 1880 by Georges Rayet and worked as an assistant astronomer. He is credited by the Minor Planet Center with the discovery of two asteroids at Bordeaux in 1894. He also made meteorological observations.
