= WR 137 =

Star in the constellation of Cygnus

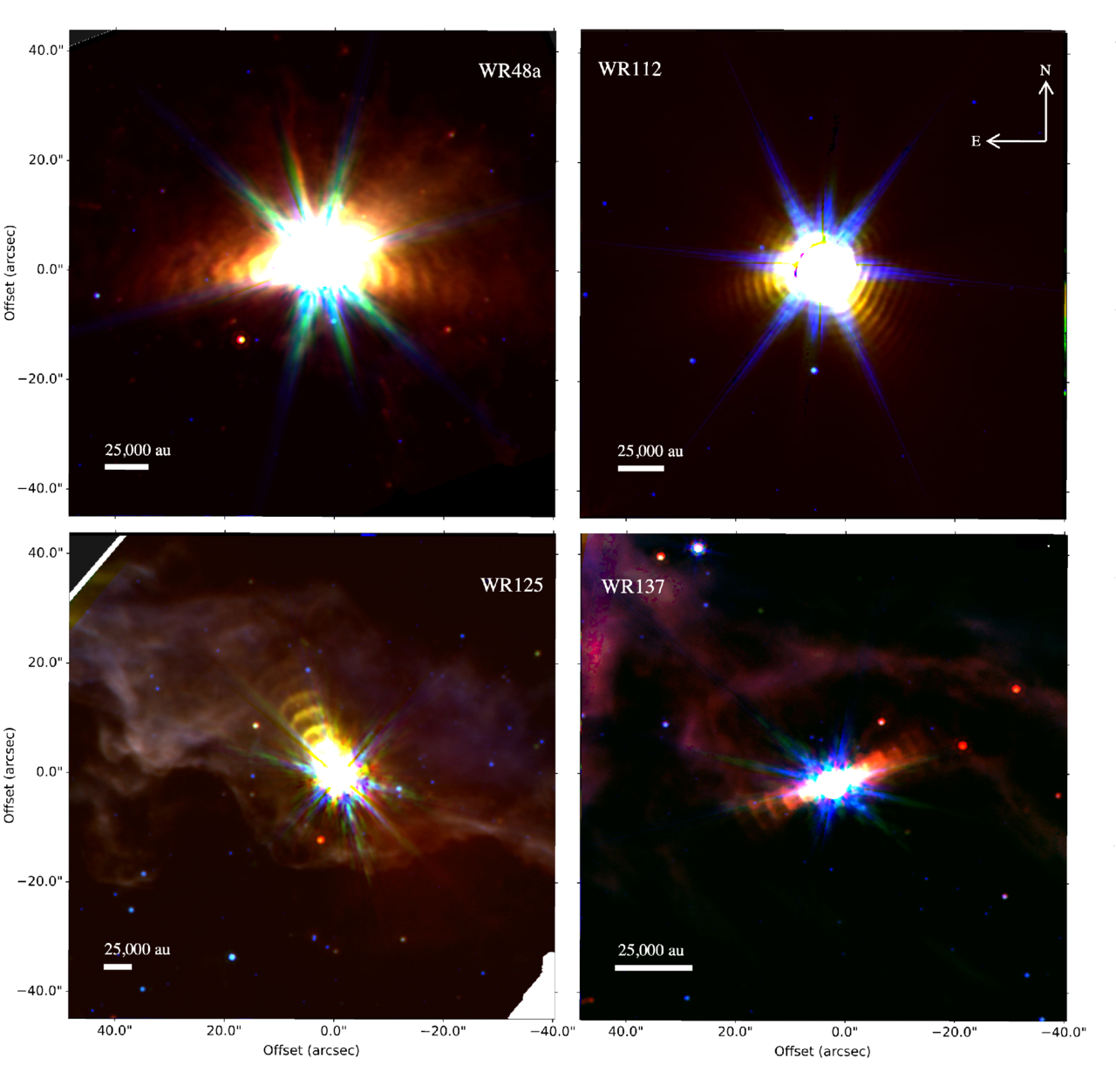
- JWST MIRI image of the nebula around WR 137

Observation data Epoch J2000 Equinox ICRS
- Constellation: Cygnus
- Right ascension: 20^{h} 14^{m} 31.76669^{s}
- Declination: +36° 39′ 39.5982″
- Apparent magnitude (V): 7.91 (7.86 - 7.93)

Characteristics
- Evolutionary stage: Wolf-Rayet
- Spectral type: WC7pd + O9V
- U−B color index: −0.40
- B−V color index: +0.29
- Variable type: WR

Astrometry
Proper motion (μ)	RA: −2.681 mas/yr Dec.: −5.739 mas/yr
Parallax (π)	0.4898±0.0172 mas
Distance	6,700 ± 200 ly (2,040 ± 70 pc)
Absolute magnitude (M_{V})	−5.7 (−4.18 + −4.34)

Orbit
Primary	WR
Name	O
Period (P)	13.105 ± 0.034 yr
Semi-major axis (a)	8.575 ± 0.020 mas
Eccentricity (e)	0.3162 ± 0.0023
Inclination (i)	97.138 ± 0.063°
Longitude of the node (Ω)	117.934 ± 0.039°
Periastron epoch (T)	2023.857 ± 0.020
Argument of periastron (ω) (primary)	361.24 ± 0.99°
Semi-amplitude (K_{1}) (primary)	25.6 ± 2.2 km/s

Details

WR
Mass	9.49±3.41 M_{☉}
Radius	3.8 ± 1 R_{☉}
Luminosity	398,000 L_{☉}
Temperature	60,000 ± 5,000 K

O
Mass	17.34±1.91 M_{☉}
Radius	7.7 ± 1 R_{☉}
Luminosity	158,000 L_{☉}
Surface gravity (log g)	4.0 ± 0.3 cgs
Temperature	32,000 ± 2,000 K
Rotational velocity (v sin i)	220 ± 20 km/s
Age	4.1 Myr

Other designations
- V1679 Cygni, WR 137, HD 192641, HIP 99769, BD+35°4001, Hen 3-1839

Database references
SIMBAD	data

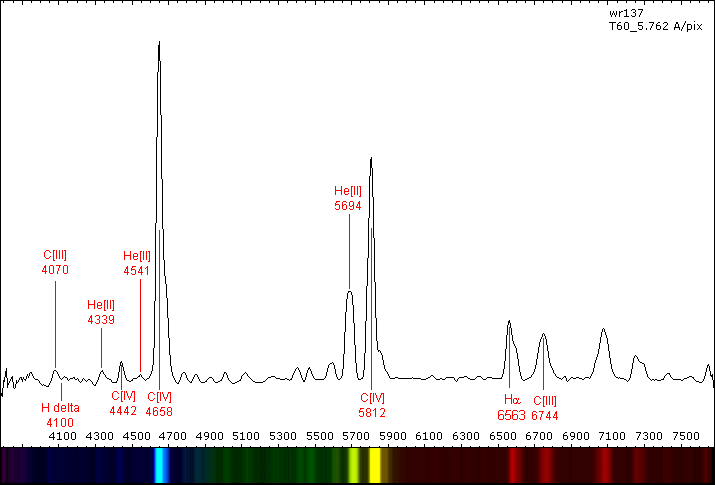
Spectrum of WR 137 showing the prominent emission lines of ionised Carbon and Helium

WR 137 is a variable Wolf-Rayet star located around 6,000 light years away from Earth in the constellation of Cygnus.

WR 137, together with WR 134 and WR 135, was one of three stars in Cygnus observed in 1867 to have unusual spectra consisting of intense emission lines rather than the more normal continuum and absorption lines. These were the first members of the class of stars that came to be called Wolf-Rayet stars (WR stars) after Charles Wolf and Georges Rayet who discovered their unusual appearance. It is a member of the carbon sequence of WR stars, indicated by the lack of nitrogen lines and the strength of carbon emission. WR 137 has a spectrum with C_{III} emission weaker than C_{IV} and O_{V} weaker still, leading to the assignment of a WC7 spectral type. The spectrum also shows emission lines of He_{II} and O_{IV}.

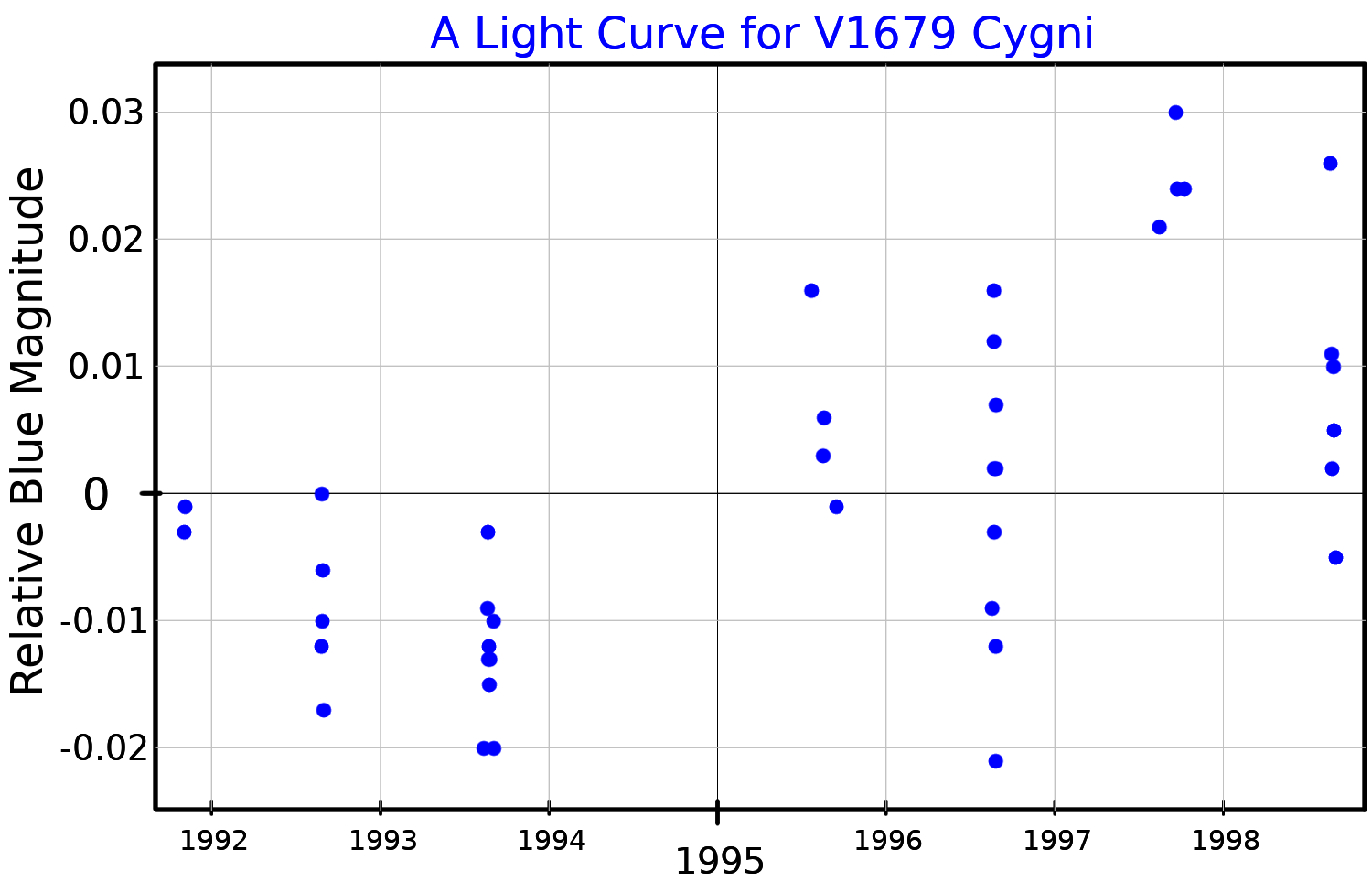
A blue band light curve for V1679 Cygni, plotted from data published by Panov et al. (2000)

WR 137 is a binary system, with an O9 main sequence or giant companion. The two stars orbit every thirteen years in a mildly eccentric orbit, and there is an episode of dust production near periastron. The inclination of the orbit is high, near 97 degrees. The O star is visually brighter and more massive, but the WR star dominates the spectrum and has a higher bolometric luminosity. Visible in the spectrum are absorption lines and some narrow emission lines, each thought to originate from the secondary star. The line profiles suggest a decretion disc around the star, produced by its rapid rotation, which would make it the only known system containing a WR star and an Oe star.

WR 137 is about a degree away from WR 135 and the two are believed to lie at approximately the same distance from Earth within the Cygnus OB3 association. Its properties are uncertain because of the presence of the hot luminous companion. A pseudo-fit of the combined spectrum yielded a temperature of 56,000 K, a luminosity of 537,000 L_{☉}, and a radius of 10 R_{☉}. A more typical radius for a WC7 star would be 4.5 R_{☉}, implying a hotter temperature.

Evolutionary modelling of the WR 137 pair suggest an initial mass for the primary of 60 M_{☉} and for the secondary of 30 M_{☉}, with an age of 4.1 million years. The initial orbital period would have been around 1,580 days. Around three M_{☉} have been transferred from the primary to the secondary.

Observations with JWST instrument MIRI did resolve 10 rings around the binary, representing 131 years of dust ejection. The dust moves with a speed of 1700 km/s, near the terminal velocity. Each ring represents a dust plume, which starts to form near a quadrature in their orbit and continues after the conjunction. This results in dust being seen in both directions along the nearly edge-on orbital plane.
