= WR 134 =

Star in the constellation of Cygnus

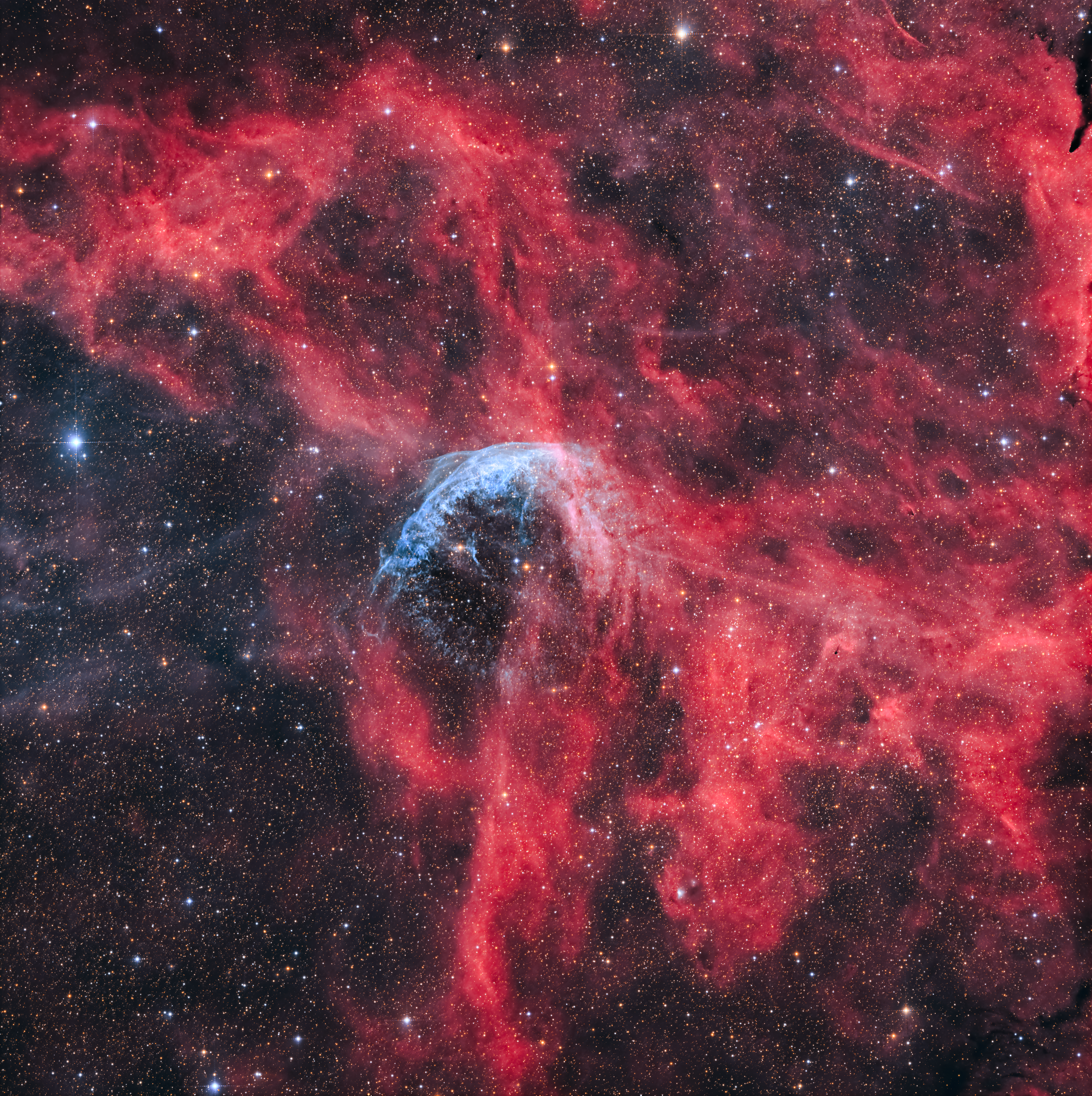
- WR 134 star and the circular bubble nebula forming around it

Observation data Epoch J2000 Equinox ICRS
- Constellation: Cygnus
- Right ascension: 20^{h} 10^{m} 14.193^{s}
- Declination: +36° 10′ 35.07″
- Apparent magnitude (V): 8.08

Characteristics
- Evolutionary stage: Wolf–Rayet
- Spectral type: WN6-s
- U−B color index: −0.44
- B−V color index: 0.00
- Variable type: Algol

Astrometry
Proper motion (μ)	RA: −5.128 mas/yr Dec.: −8.323 mas/yr
Parallax (π)	0.5418±0.0308 mas
Distance	1,750+130 −110 pc
Absolute magnitude (M_{V})	−5.09

Details
Mass	18 M_{☉}
Radius	5.25 R_{☉}
Luminosity	407,000 L_{☉}
Temperature	63,100 K

Other designations
- V1769 Cygni, BD+35°4001, HD 191765, WR 134, HIP 99377, SAO 69541

Database references
SIMBAD	data

WR 134 is a variable Wolf-Rayet star located around 6,000 light years away from Earth in the constellation of Cygnus, surrounded by a faint bubble nebula blown by the intense radiation and fast wind from the star. It is five times the radius of the sun, but due to a temperature over 63,000 K it is 400,000 times as luminous as the Sun.

WR 134 was one of three stars in Cygnus observed in 1867 to have unusual spectra consisting of intense emission lines rather than the more normal continuum and absorption lines. These were the first members of the class of stars that came to be called Wolf-Rayet stars (WR stars) after Charles Wolf and Georges Rayet who discovered their unusual appearance. It is a member of the nitrogen sequence of WR stars, while the other two (WR 135 and WR 137) are both members of the carbon sequence that also have OB companions. WR 134 has a spectrum with NIII and NIV emission between two and five times stronger than NV, leading to the assignment of a WN6 spectral type. The spectrum also shows strong HeII emission and weaker lines of HeI and CIV.

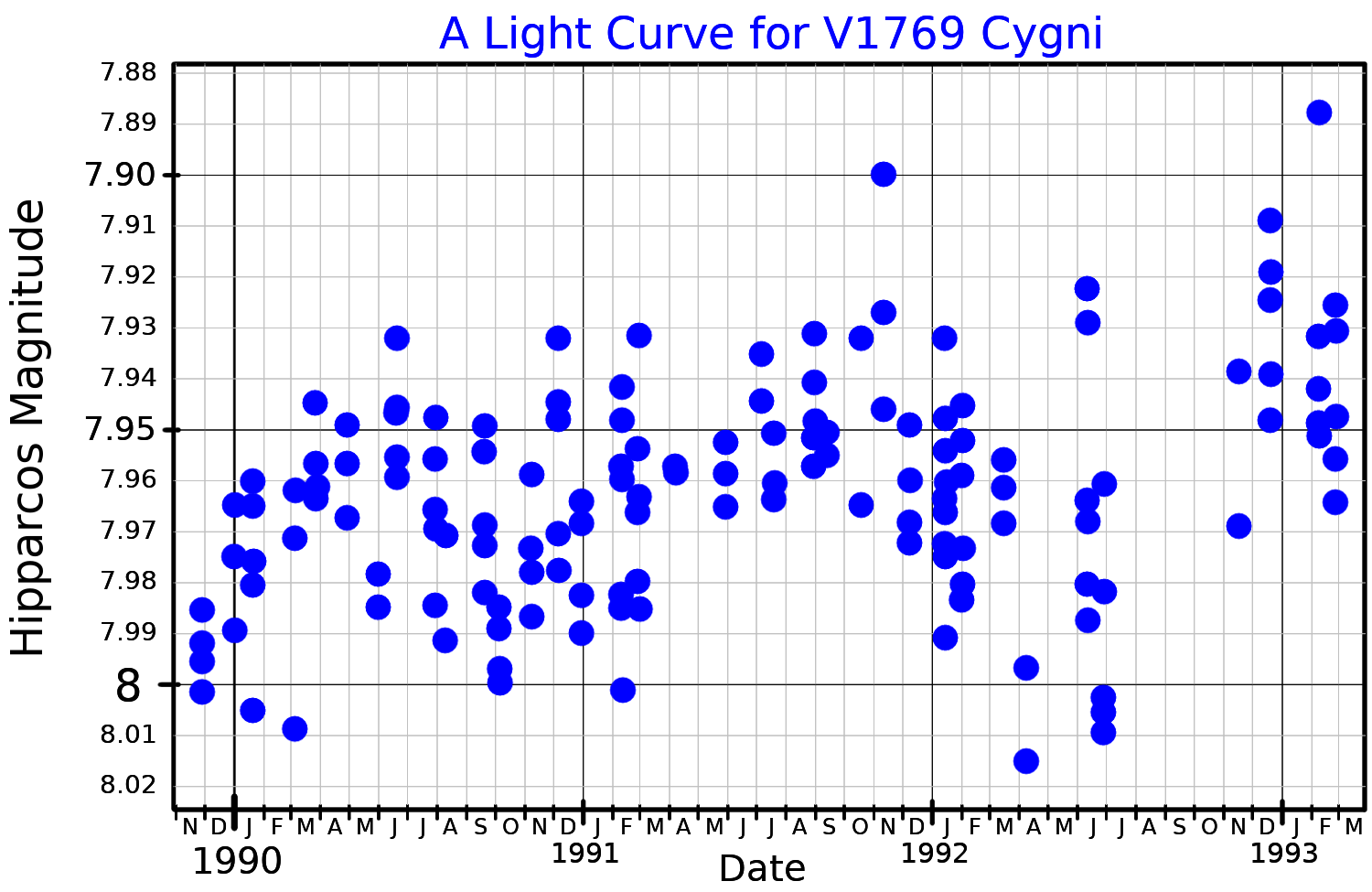
A light curve for V1769 Cygni, adapted from Marchenko et al. (1998)

WR 134 is classified as an Algol type eclipsing variable and given the designation V1769 Cygni, but the variation is not strictly periodic and brightness changes occur on timescales of hours to days. It has been investigated several times to search for companions. Morel reported a 2.25 day primary period but considered the variations to be due to rotational modulation rather than the effects of a companion. Rustamov suggests a 1.887 day orbital period with a K-M dwarf companion, but with additional optical variations.

Both hard and soft X-rays have been detected from WR 134 but the sources are not fully explained. The emissions do not match a single star of the expected temperature, are not sufficient for colliding winds between two hot stars, and any compact source such as a neutron star or cool dwarf would be in an unlikely orbit.

WR 134 is less than a degree away from WR 135 and the two are believed to lie at approximately the same distance from Earth within the Cygnus OB3 association. Both stars lie within a shell of hydrogen thought to have been swept up from the interstellar medium when one or both stars were on the main sequence. The shell is over forty parsecs wide and contains about 1,830 M_{☉} of hydrogen. It is unclear which of the two stars is primarily responsible for creating the shell.
