= 387 Aquitania =

Main-belt asteroid

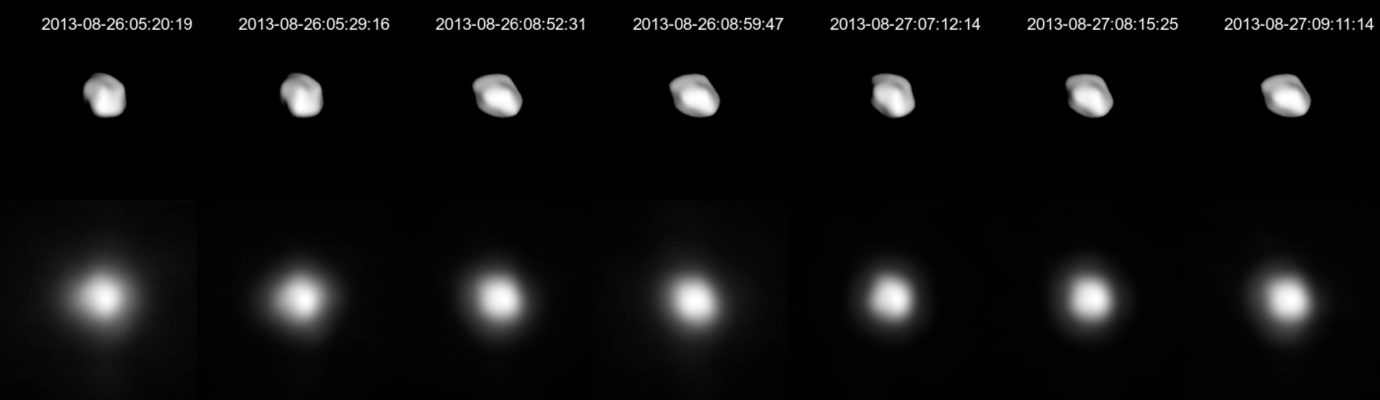
- Lightcurve-base 3D-model of Aquitania on the top with an image of the asteroid on the bottom.

Discovery
- Discovered by: F. Courty
- Discovery site: Bordeaux Obs.
- Discovery date: 5 March 1894

Designations
- Pronunciation: /ækwɪˈteɪniə/
- Named after: Aquitaine (Roman Gallia Aquitania)
- Alternative designations: 1894 AZ · 1945 NA; 1948 BG · 1953 EO_{1}
- Minor planet category: main-belt · (middle); Postrema
- Symbol: Symbol for 387 Aquitania: the Leo symbol on a shield

Orbital characteristics
- Epoch 4 September 2017 (JD 2458000.5)
- Uncertainty parameter 0
- Observation arc: 123.56 yr (45,132 days)
- Aphelion: 3.3853 AU
- Perihelion: 2.0964 AU
- Semi-major axis: 2.7409 AU
- Eccentricity: 0.2351
- Orbital period (sidereal): 4.54 yr (1,657 days)
- Mean anomaly: 330.99°
- Mean motion: 0° 13^{m} 1.92^{s} / day
- Inclination: 18.113°
- Longitude of ascending node: 128.24°
- Argument of perihelion: 157.14°

Physical characteristics
- Dimensions: 97±4 km
- Mass: (1.14±0.24)×10^{18} kg (Note: Calculated from its standard gravitational parameter GM = 0.076±0.016 km^{3}/s^{2}.)
- Mean density: 2.40±0.59 g/cm^{3}
- Synodic rotation period: 24.14012 h (1.005838 d)
- Pole ecliptic longitude: 123° ± 5°
- Pole ecliptic latitude: 46° ± 5°
- Geometric albedo: 0.1900±0.011
- Spectral type: Tholen = S SMASS = L B–V = 0.881; U–B = 0.449
- Absolute magnitude (H): 7.49 · 7.55 · 7.44±0.02

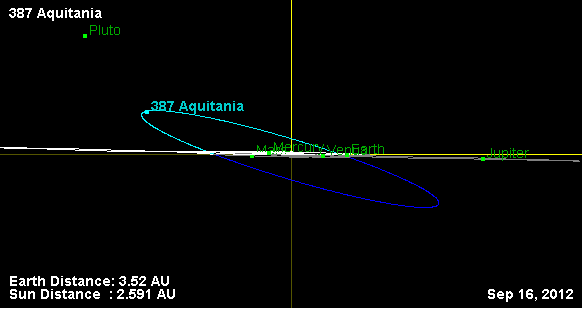
Orbital diagram depicting Aquitania's 18° inclination.

387 Aquitainia, provisional designation 1894 AZ, is a Postremian asteroid from the central regions of the asteroid belt, approximately 101 kilometers in diameter. Discovered by Fernand Courty at the Bordeaux Observatory in 1894, it was named for the French region of Aquitaine, the former province of Gallia Aquitania in the ancient Roman Empire.

== Discovery ==
Aquitania was discovered by French astronomer Fernand Courty at the Bordeaux Observatory on 5 March 1894. It was second of his two asteroid discoveries. The first was 384 Burdigala.

== Classification and orbit ==
Aquitania is the largest member of the Postrema family (541), a mid-sized central asteroid family of little more than 100 members. It orbits the Sun in the central main-belt at a distance of 2.1–3.4 AU once every 4 years and 6 months (1,657 days). Its orbit has an eccentricity of 0.24 and an inclination of 18° with respect to the ecliptic.

== Physical characteristics ==
In the Tholen and SMASS classification, Aquitania is an S-type and L-type asteroid, respectively. Several rotational lightcurves of Aquitania have been obtained from photometric observations since the 1980s. Lightcurve analysis gave a consolidated rotation period of 24.144 hours with a brightness variation between 0.09 and 0.25 magnitude (U=3).

According to the surveys carried out by the Infrared Astronomical Satellite IRAS, the Japanese Akari satellite and the NEOWISE mission of NASA's Wide-field Infrared Survey Explorer, Aquitania measures between 97.33 and 105.06 kilometers in diameter and its surface has an albedo between 0.174 and 0.203.

The Collaborative Asteroid Lightcurve Link adopts the results obtained by IRAS, that is an albedo of 0.19 and a diameter of 100.51 kilometers based on an absolute magnitude of 7.44.

== Naming ==
This minor planet was named for the Latin name of the French region of Aquitaine. Under Caesar the Roman region of Gallia Aquitania consisted of the country between the Pyrenees mountains and Garonne river. The region was later expanded to the Loire and Allier rivers under Augustus. The official naming citation was mentioned in The Names of the Minor Planets by Paul Herget in 1955 (H 42).
