= Burdigala (disambiguation) =

Burdigala was a town located in today's Bordeaux, France.

Burdigala may also refer to:

- SS Burdigala, an ocean liner
- 384 Burdigala, an asteroid
