= Hector de Pétigny =

French painter

- Born: 1904; Vorges, Aisne, France
- Died: 1992 (aged 87–88); Vorges, Aisne, France
- Occupation: Painter
- Known for: Windows in Basilica of Saint-Quentin

Hector de Pétigny (1904–92) was a French artist who made paintings, sculpture, engravings and stained glass. After World War II (1939–45) he undertook many commissions from the historical monuments organization in Picardy, where many historical buildings had been damaged. He is perhaps best known for the stained glass windows he made for the Basilica of Saint-Quentin.

== Life ==
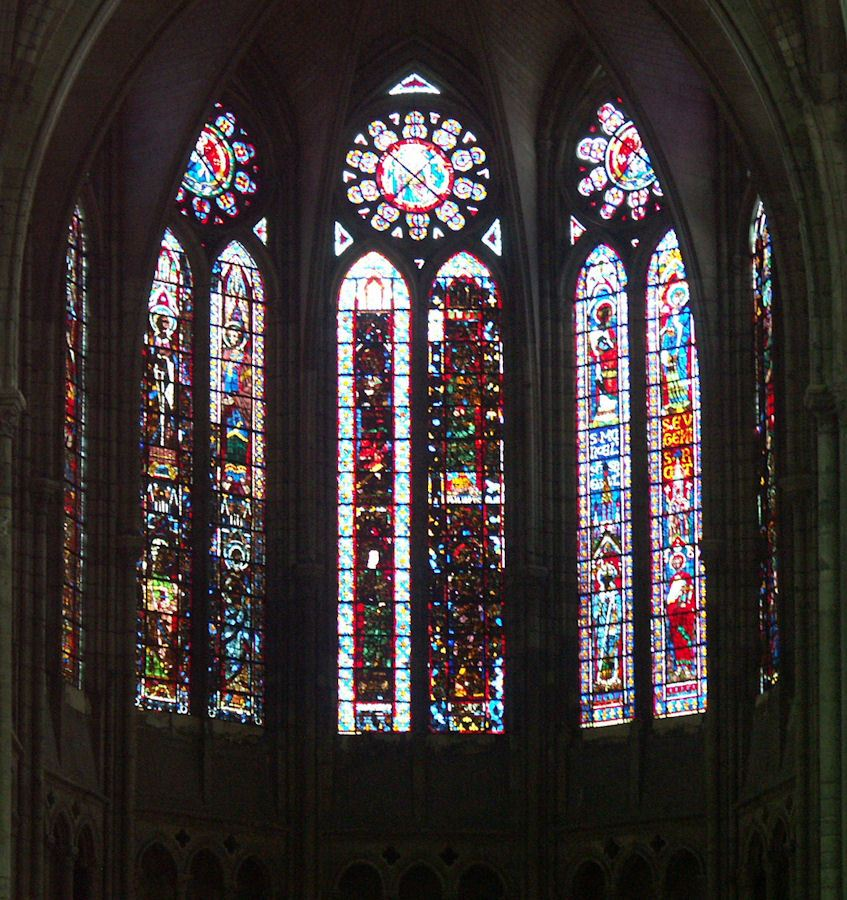
Stained glass windows in the Basilica of Saint-Quentin

Hector de Pétigny was born in 1904. He studied art in Valenciennes, then in 1923 was admitted to the École des Beaux Arts in Paris. He left that school in 1934. He became a member of the Témoignage (Testimony) group, which included Jean Le Moal, Étienne Martin, Alfred Manessier, Jean Bertholle and Le Corbusier. He exhibited with this group in New York in 1939. He regularly exhibited at the Salon des Indépendants until 1948. De Pétigny taught in Paris at the École d’Art et Publicité (School of Art and Advertising).

There were many reconstruction projects in Picardy in the aftermath of World War II. From 1951 de Pétigny began to accept commissions from the Monuments Historiques. He was asked to create replacement stained glass windows for the Basilica of Saint-Quentin, which had been badly damaged during World War I (1914–18). From 1954 Hector de Pétigny created 16 stained glass windows for the choir of the basilica in the upper levels of nine bays, each almost 14 metres (46 ft) high. He also created the stained glass of seven medallions of almost 2 metres (6 ft 7 in) in diameter, mounted above the windows. He made stations of the cross in churches in Vorges, Coucy-le-Château and Marle, and made wooden decorations for the departmental archives in Laon.

In 1969 Hector de Pétigny returned to his family home in Vorges, Aisne, where he lived the rest of his life. He died in 1992. The Association des Amis de Laon et du Laonnois has established a Hector de Pétigny tour of the sites in northern Aisne where the artist's works may be seen with descriptive panels.

== Work ==
Hector de Pétigny worked in sculpture, painting, engraving and stained glass. His vigorous, modernist style was never completely abstract, and at one stage he experimented with surrealism. He was also interested in cubism. His use of geometric forms placed him in the "Second School of Paris" after the war.

== Sources ==
- "Basilique Saint-Quentin". Orgues en France.
- "Hector de Pétigny" (in French). Depot.com.
- Houssin, Gaetan (2007). "La basilique de Saint Quentin". Domaine de Vadancourt (in French). Archived from the original on 2015-12-06.
- Picardia (2015). "Pétigny, Hector de". Picardia, l'encyclopédie picarde (in French). Région Picardie.
