= Vorges =

- Commune
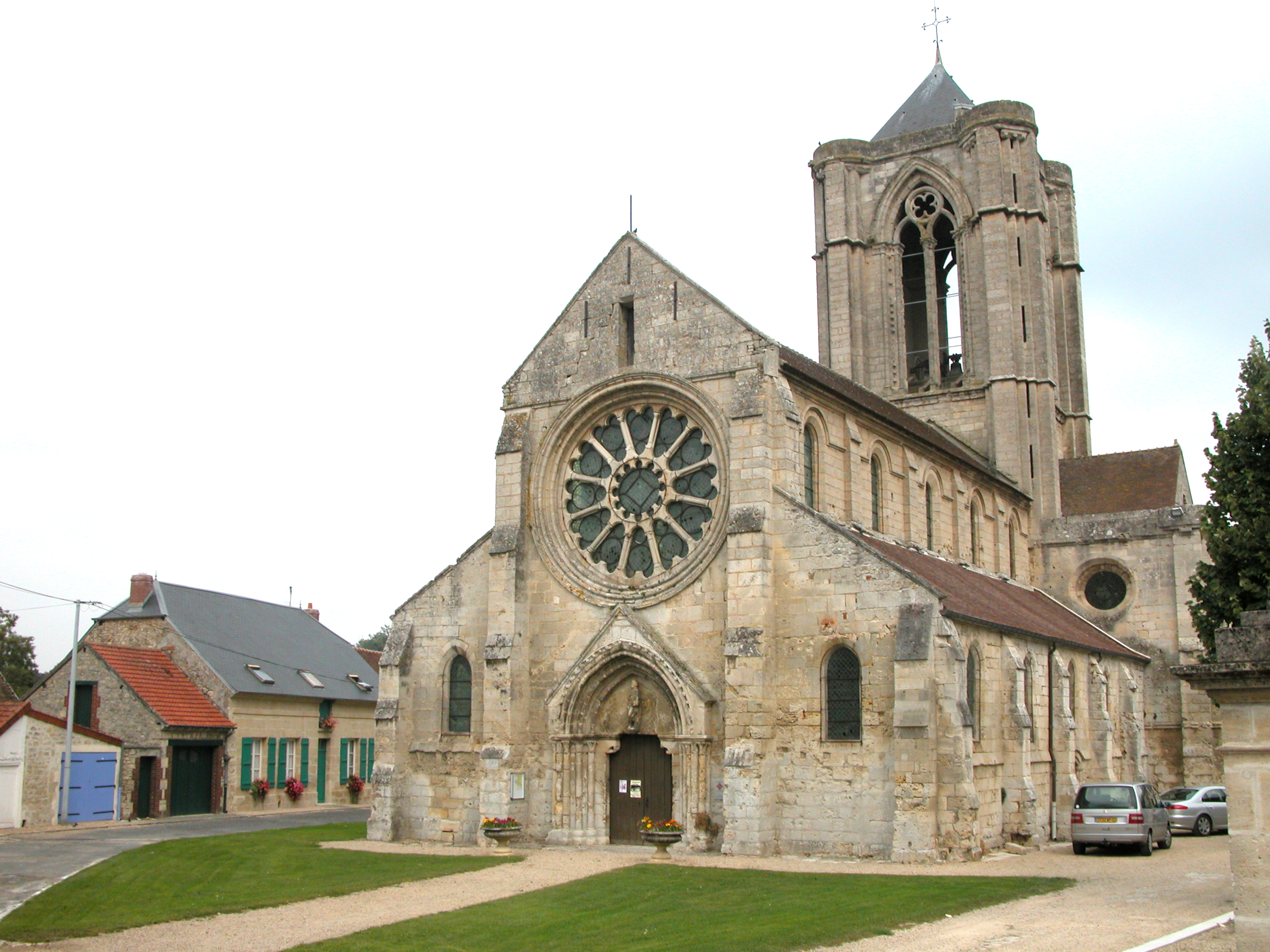
- The church of Vorges

- Coat of arms
- Location of Vorges
- Location within France Location within Hauts-de-France
- Coordinates: 49°31′08″N 3°39′19″E
- Country: France
- Region: Hauts-de-France
- Department: Aisne
- Arrondissement: Laon
- Canton: Laon-2
- Intercommunality: CA Pays de Laon

Government
  - Mayor (2026–32): Philippe Maquin
- Area^{1}: 4.78 km^{2} (1.85 sq mi)
- Elevation: 85 m (279 ft)
- Highest elevation: 193 m (633 ft)
- Lowest elevation: 70 m (230 ft)
- Population (2023): 383
  - Density: 80.1/km^{2} (208/sq mi)
- Time zone: UTC+01:00 (CET)
  - Summer (DST): UTC+02:00 (CEST)
- INSEE/Postal code: 02824 /02860
- ^{1} French Land Register data, which excludes lakes, ponds, glaciers > 1 km^{2} (0.386 sq mi or 247 acres) and river estuaries.

Vorges (French pronunciation: [vɔʁʒ]) is a commune in the Aisne department in Hauts-de-France in northern France.

== Population ==
Historical population
Year	Pop.	±% p.a.
1968	355	—
1975	343	−0.49%
1982	353	+0.41%
1990	388	+1.19%
1999	377	−0.32%
2007	379	+0.07%
2012	381	+0.11%
2017	370	−0.58%
2023	383	+0.58%
Source: INSEE

== People associated with the commune ==
- Édouard Fleury (1815–83): Historian, writer
- Champfleury (1821–89): Journalist, writer
- Gaston Ganault (1831–94): Barrister, deputy
- Ernest Ganault (1868–1936): Doctor, deputy
- Hector de Pétigny (1904-1992): Artist
- Charles Wolf (1827-1918): Astronomer

== See also ==
- Communes of the Aisne department
