= Basilica of Saint-Quentin =

Basilica located in Aisne, in France

- Basilique Saint-Quentin
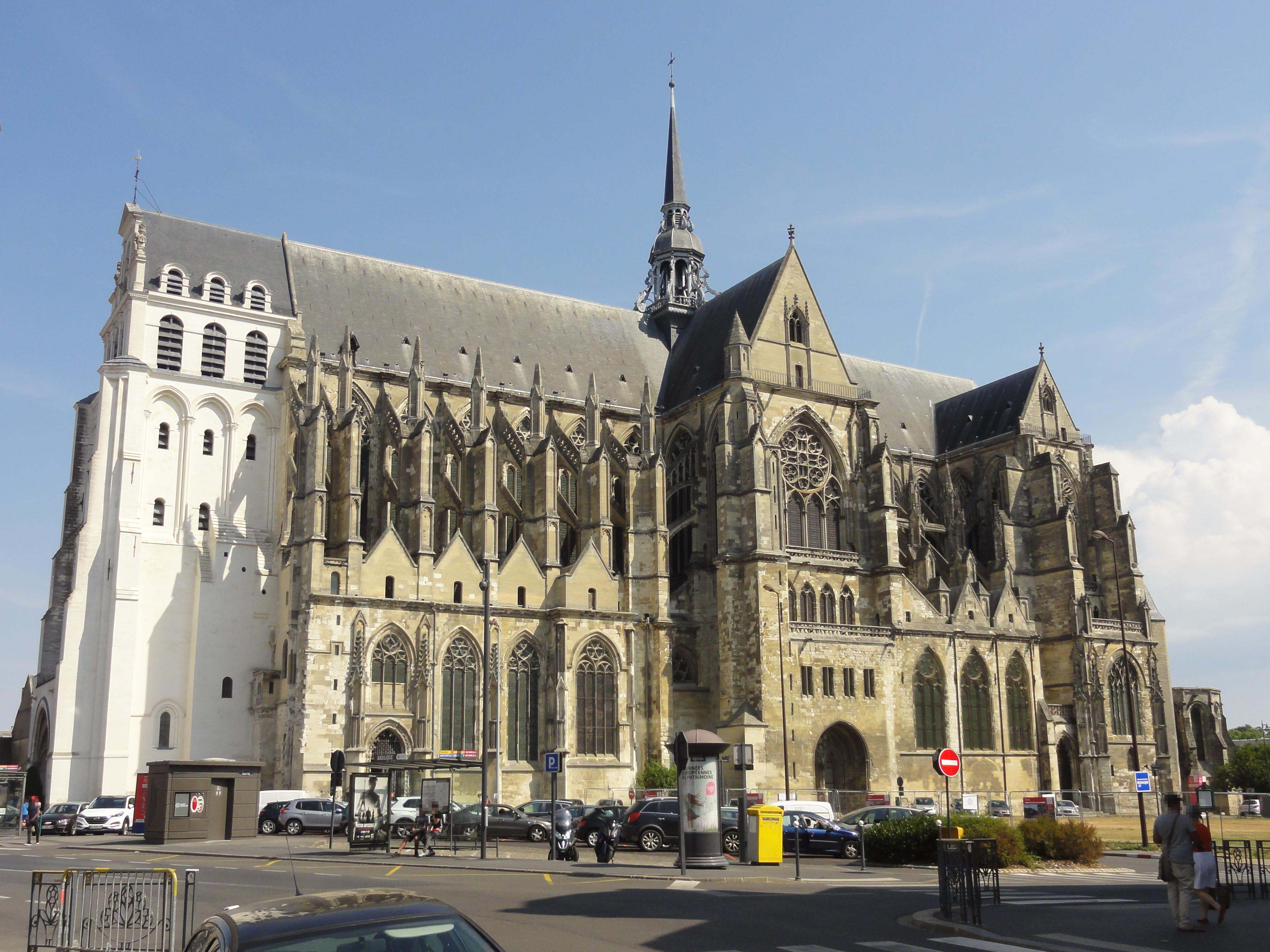
- The basilica from the south in 2018

- Location within France

Religion
- Affiliation: Roman Catholic
- Diocese: Diocese of Soissons

Location
- Location: Saint-Quentin, Aisne, France
- State: France
- Interactive map of Basilica of Saint-Quentin
- Coordinates: 49.847792°N 3.289917°E

Architecture
- Style: Gothic
- Completed: 12th – 16th century

Specifications
- Length: 133 metres (436 ft)
- Width (nave): 42 metres (138 ft)
- Spire height: 82 metres (269 ft)

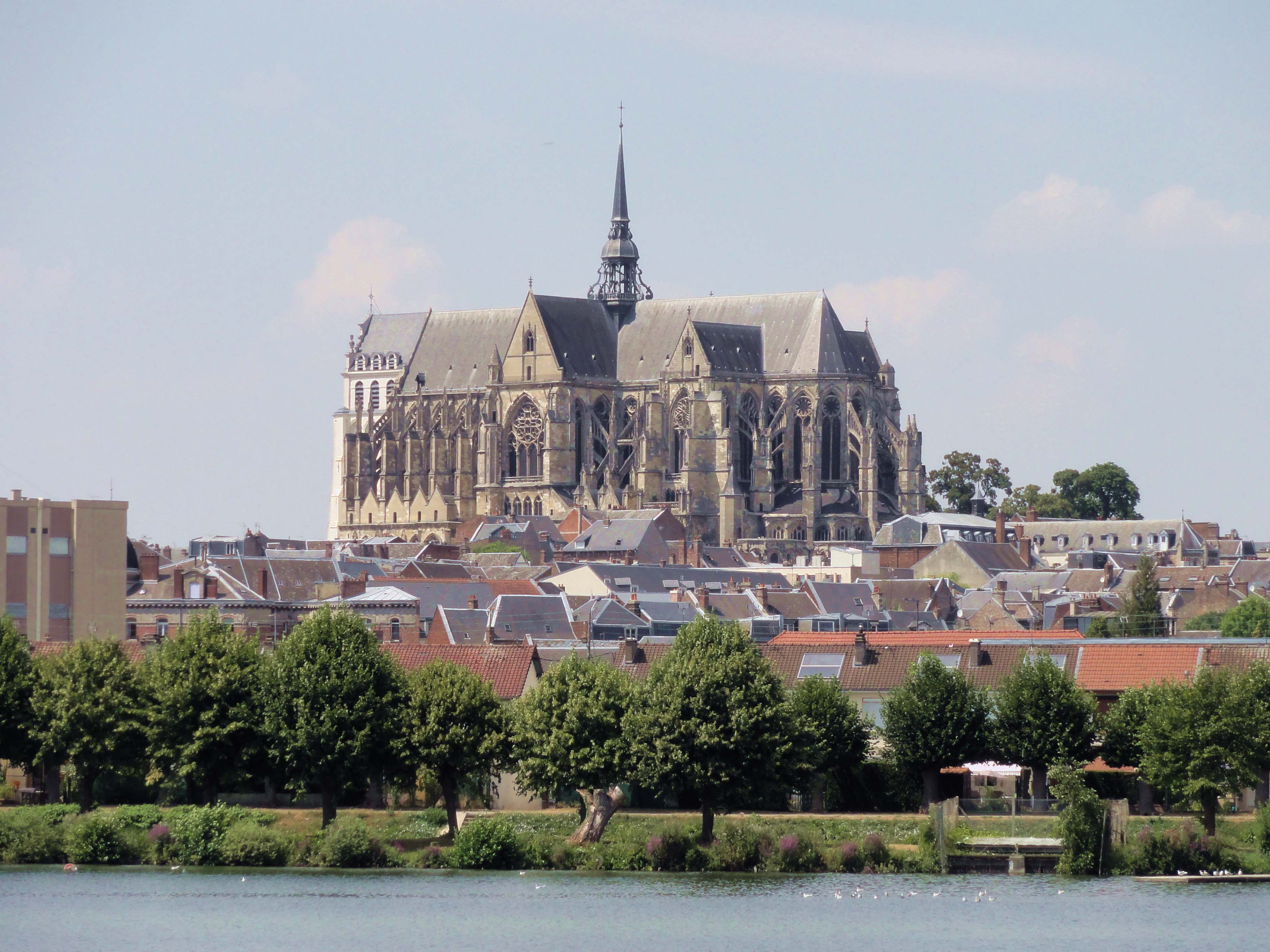
Basilica seen from the Somme river.

The Basilica of Saint-Quentin (French: Basilique Saint-Quentin), formerly the Collegiate Church of Saint-Quentin (French: Collégiale Saint-Quentin) is a Catholic church in the town of Saint-Quentin, Aisne, France. There have been religious buildings on the site since the 4th century AD, which were repeatedly destroyed and rebuilt during the Early Middle Ages. The present basilica was constructed in stages between the 12th and 15th centuries. It was severely damaged in World War I (1914–18), and was only reopened in 1956 after extensive reconstruction.

== Origins ==
The town of Saint-Quentin has been identified with the Roman city of Augusta Veromandurorum, a commercial center at an important crossroads. It takes its present name from the Christian missionary Saint Caius Quintinus, who was beheaded there in 287 AD. Legend says the body was found many years later in the nearby marches of the River Somme by a Roman widow named Eusebia. She reburied the remains at the top of the hill at the center of the present town and built a small shrine to the martyr. Excavations round the crypt of the present church have indeed found traces of a building from this date.

Some sources say the town became the seat of a bishopric around 365, but after barbarians destroyed it in 531 the bishop moved to Noyon. The chapel is listed as a pilgrimage destination by Gregory of Tours (c. 538–594). Saint Eligius (c. 588–660), Bishop of Noyon and counselor to Dagobert I, Merovingian king of France, rediscovered the tomb in the 7th century "under the pavement of the basilica". There are records of Saint Eligius having enlarged the building. Remains of a floor from this period have been found near the crypt. A large fragment of mosaic has been preserved.

The first community of monks was established in or around Saint-Quentin by the mid-7th century, probably by Irish monks with the backing of the bishops of Noyon. The bishops claimed ecclesiastic jurisdiction over most of Vermandois, including Saint-Quentin. The church was rebuilt with the assistance of Charlemagne (c. 747–814), and consecrated by Pope Stephen IV (r. 816–817). There may have been two churches in the early Middle Ages, one dedicated to Saint Quentin and the other to the Virgin Mary. Archaeologists have found the remains of walls from the Carolingian period, when the location was a flourishing monastery and pilgrimage site. Limited archaeological investigations indicate that the crypt in the section of the nave between the two transepts may have replaced a Carolingian crypt with a circular corridor.

The church was burned down by the Normans in 816, rebuilt in 824 and burned down again in 883. The site was fortified after 883. In 900 the bodies of Saint-Quentin and two other saints were placed in stone sarcophagi in a newly constructed crypt. In the 10th century the Herbertian counts of Vermandois, principally Adalbert I (Albert the Pious c. 915–987), replaced the monks with a congregation of secular canons. The counts claimed the title of abbot, and were overlords of the church. A dean administered the collegiate church. The dean was appointed by the count and reported only to the count, not to the bishop of Noyon and then to the archbishop of Reims. There are records of rebuilding in the mid-10th century. The church was damaged during local warfare in 1102–03. At one time Count Raoul of Vermandois (c. 1100–52) was thought to have rebuilt the church, but this now seems unlikely.

The canons of the collegiate chapter lived in separate houses within the church precincts, and most were not ordained priests. Often they were property owners and businessmen from noble families and main role was to administer the chapter's property. By 1200 the chapter was large and prosperous, with 72 canons. The semi-independent counts of Vermandois were originally closely associated with the County of Flanders, but gradually came under French control, a process that was completed when Eleanor of Vermandois died in 1214. That year Cardinal Robert of Courçon instituted a reform whereby ordained parish priests in nine parish churches would administer the sacraments, independent of the chapter, although they would pay the chapter a portion of their fees for baptisms, marriages and funerals. The construction of the huge new collegiate church may have been motivated in part by a desire of the collegiate chapter to reassert its authority after loss of jurisdiction to the town authorities and the parish priests.

== History ==
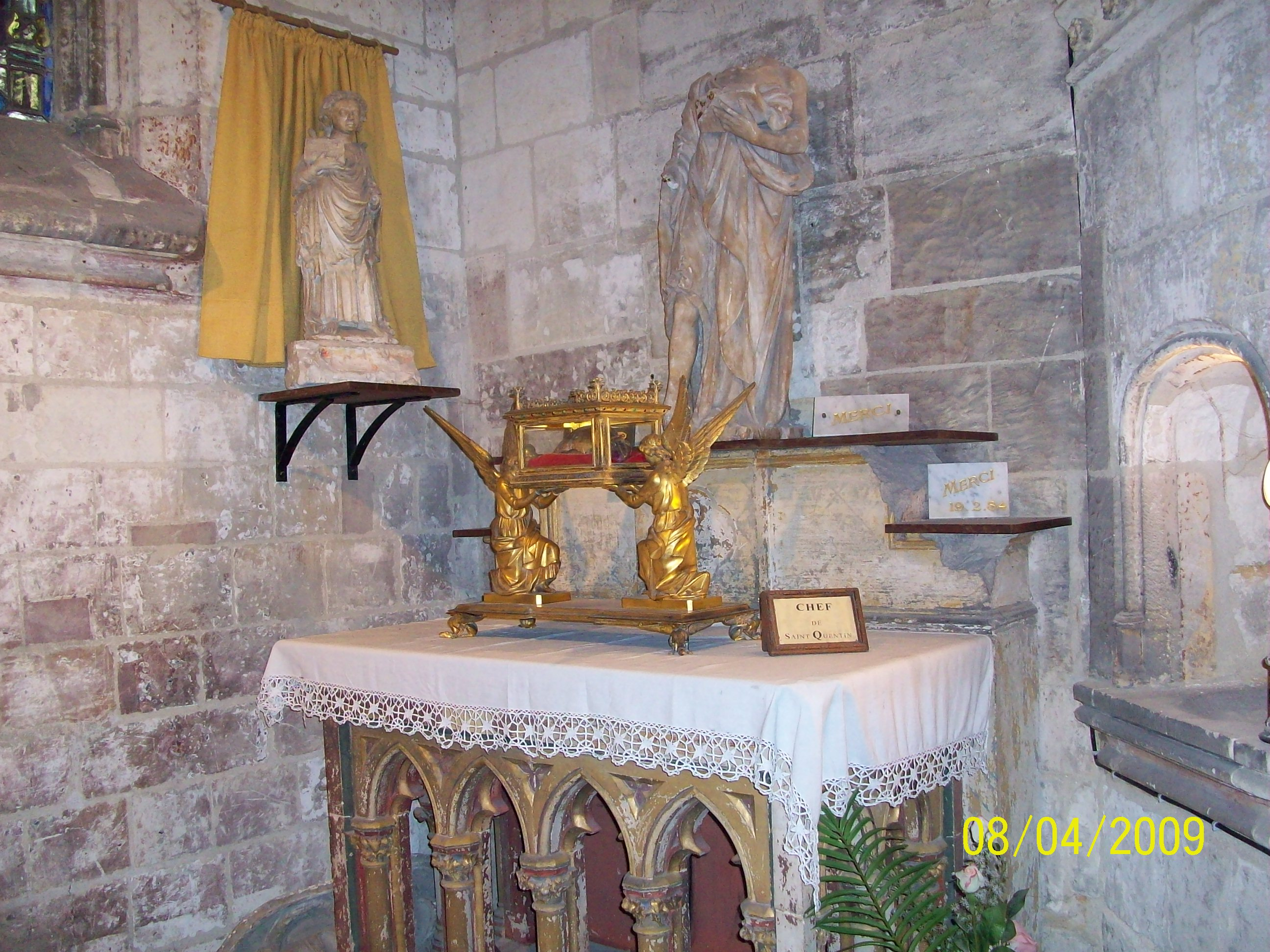
Reliquary of the skull of Saint Quentin

=== Construction ===
A tower, now the bell tower, was started around 1170. It was completed between 1195 and 1200. Around 1190 the canons decided to build a more imposing church to welcome the growing numbers of pilgrims. The apse was completed in 1205. The apse was some distance to the east of the tower. Construction then continued westward from the apse towards the 12th-century tower, which eventually became the entrance to the collegiate church.

There were frequent disputes between the chapter and the Bishops of Noyon, whose authority they refused to recognize. In the early 1220s Bishop Gérard de Bazoches placed the chapter under interdict, but in 1228 Pope Gregory IX rescinded the interdict. That year Nicolas de Roye, who was related to several of the canons, became the new bishop after Gérard's death. Later in 1228 the relics of Saint Quentin, Saint Victoric of Amiens and Saint Cassian of Auxerre were moved from the old crypt to a temporary location in the nave. (Note: Plans to move the relics of the saints seem to have been made by 1211, when the canons started work on making the reliquaries, but it took 17 years before the translation was undertaken.) The remains of the saints were exposed for veneration. Their heads, hands and arms were detached from their bodies, and each body part was placed in its own reliquary. After completion of the sanctuary the reliquaries were placed behind the high altar. The crypt, its tombs now empty, was preserved as a sacred place. (Note: During the siege of Saint-Quentin in 1557 by Philip II of Spain many of the reliquaries and their contents disappeared. Most of the remaining reliquaries were destroyed during the French Revolution, although the gilded skull of Saint Quentin and his hand have been preserved.)

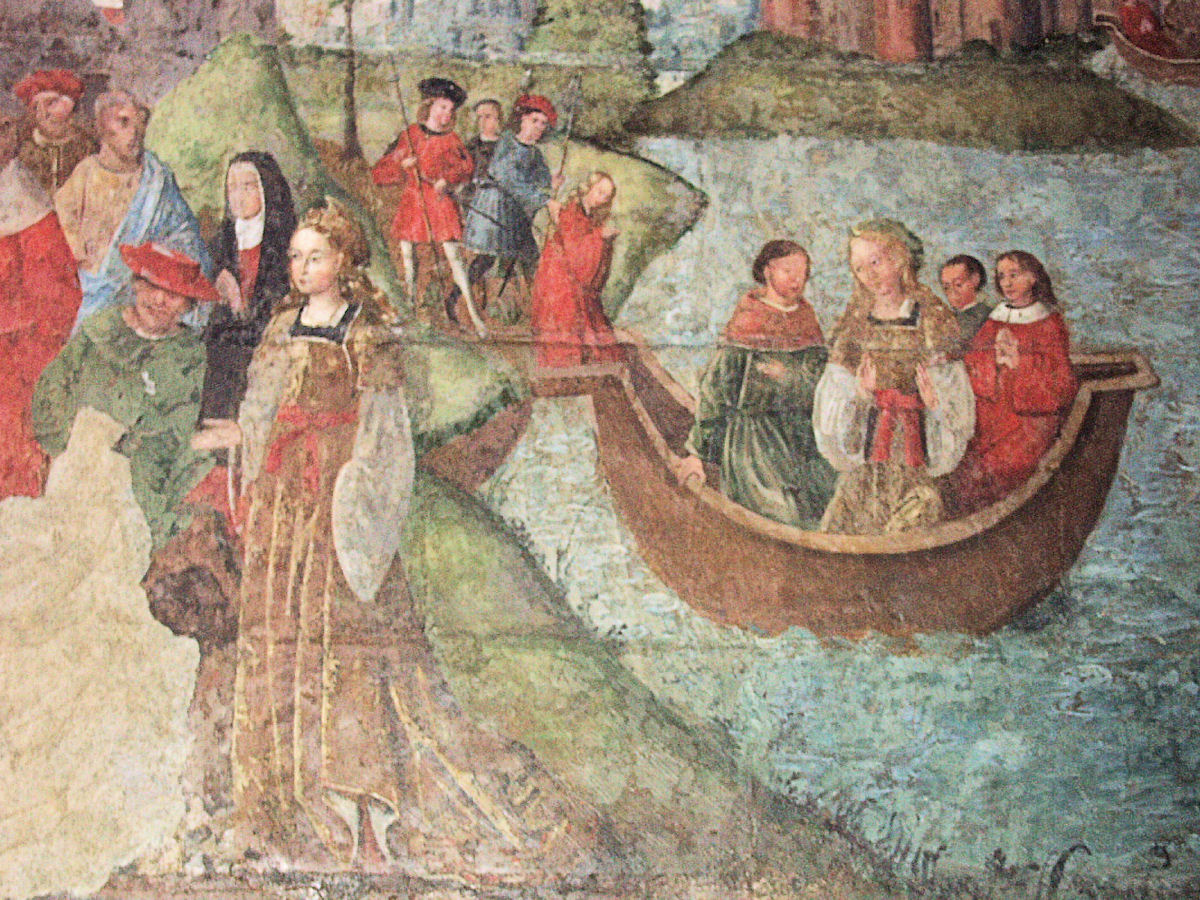
Medieval fresco

A synod was held in the church in August 1231. The archbishop sat in the center of the apse, with the bishops of Soissons, Beauvais, Noyon, Tournai and Senlis to his left, and the bishops of Laon, Châlons, Amiens, Thérouanne and Arras to his right. In 1257 Louis IX of France (1214–70) (Saint Louis) attended a great ceremony in which the relics of the saint were translated to the choir. The choir was mostly completed at that time apart from the high windows, which were built in the last third of the 13th century.

Construction proceeded slowly due to lack of funds and structural problems. In 1316 the master mason Jean Le Bel had to strengthen the pillars of the choir. His successor, Gilles Largent, repaired the cracked vaults in 1394. (Note: To this day the basilica is crooked, with wood and iron braces across the ambulatory and other signs of lack of stability in the structure.) In 1477 King Louis XI (1423–83) donated 1,000 gold crowns to completely rebuild the south arm of the small transept, which was at risk of collapsing. The large transept was completed in the middle of the 15th century. The nave was completed in 1456, finally linking the apse to the 12th-century tower of St. Michel. The portal in the tower was completed in 1477. In 1509 foundations were laid for a massive facade with two towers to replace the existing entrance tower, but this project was soon abandoned due to lack of funds.

=== Fire, war and revolution ===
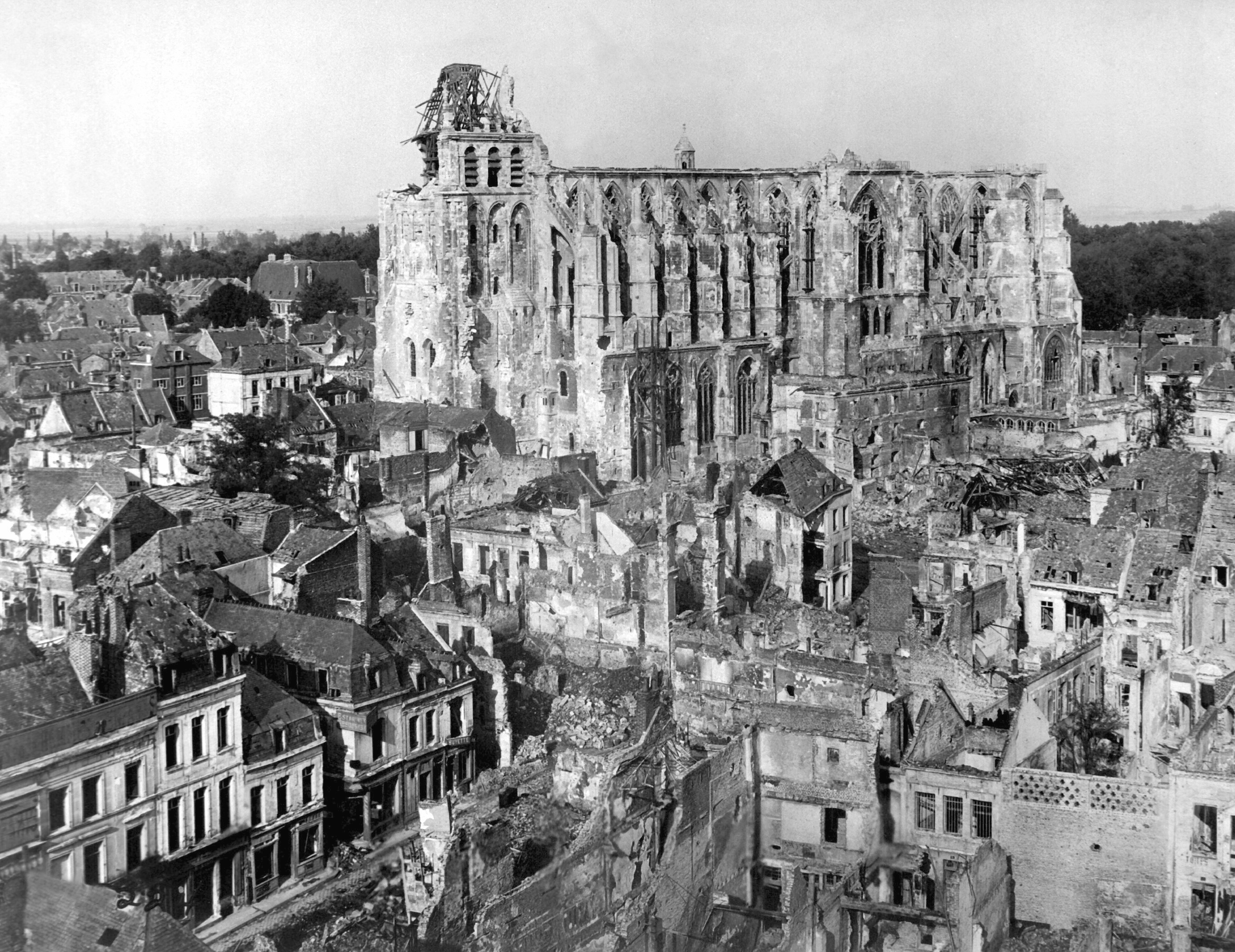
Ruined basilica on 14 October 1918

The building was damaged by a large fire in 1545, and by another fire during the Spanish siege of 1557. There was yet another fire in 1669. During the French Revolution (1789–99) the building was damaged by Jacobins who converted it into a Temple of Reason, then a fodder store and a stable. The building was given a Monument historique classification in 1840. During the Franco-Prussian War (1870–71) the building damaged by 18 shells on 19 January 1871. The building was designated a minor basilica in 1876 by Pope Pius IX.

During World War I (1914–18) the city was occupied by German forces on 28 August 1914. The priest managed to hide the most valuable possessions. On 1 July 1916 an allied airplane dropped a bomb on the railway station, which ignited a wagon of explosives. Great damage was done to the buildings of the city by the explosion, and seven of the large windows of the basilica were broken. The city was evacuated on 15 March 1917. The church roof was destroyed by fire on 15 August 1917.

When French forces recaptured Saint-Quentin on 1 October 1918 they arrested a German engineer who was preparing to blow up the severely damaged building. 93 holes had been made in the walls and pillars and filled with explosives for this purpose. By then the vaulting of the central nave had completely collapsed. Parts of the flying buttresses had been destroyed, and the walls and buttresses had many breaches. There was a risk that falls of unstable masonry could trigger larger collapses.

=== Modern reconstruction ===
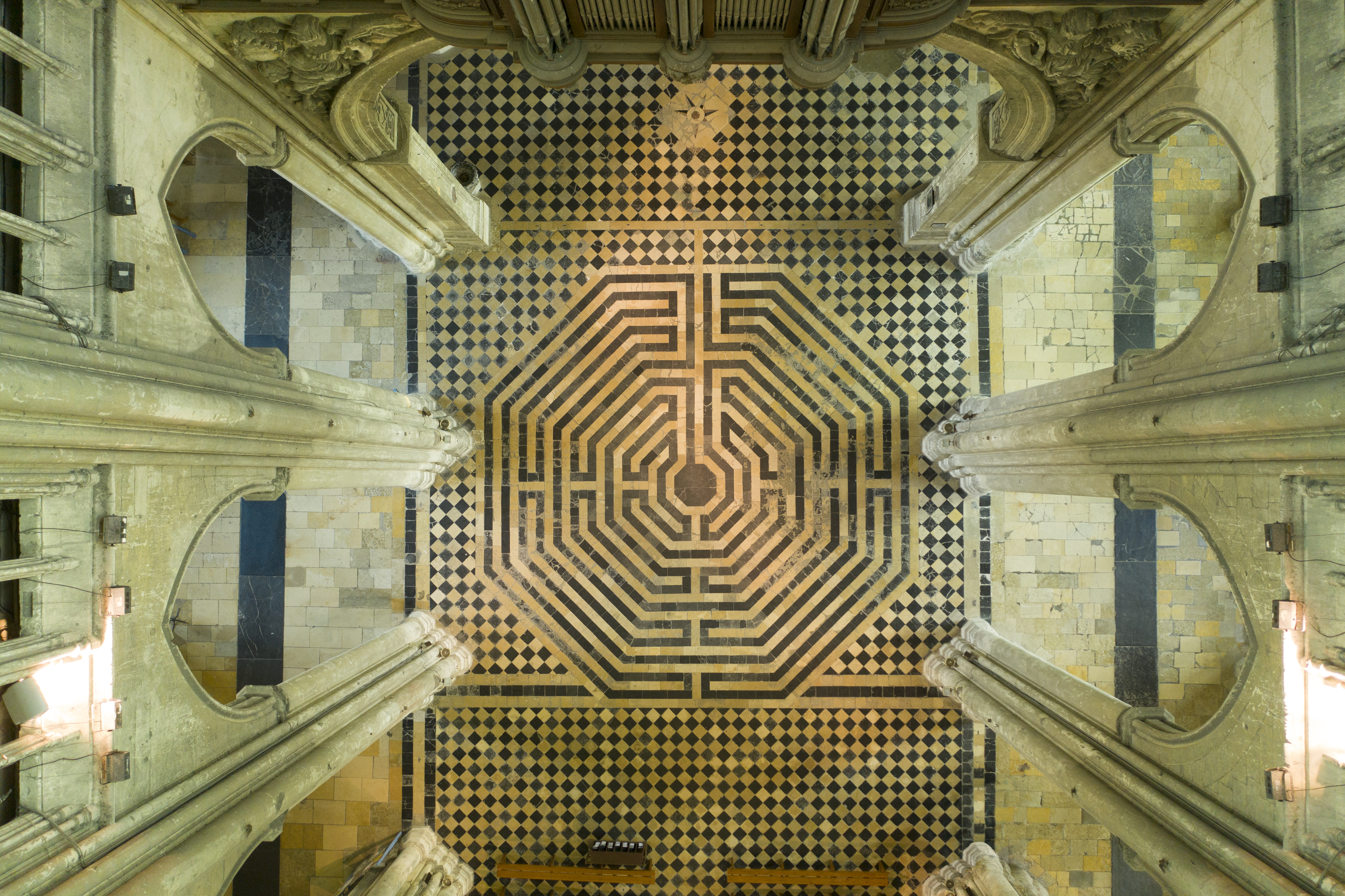
Labyrinth

Reconstruction of the basilica began in 1919, directed by the Historical Monuments Commission. Emile Brunet was charged with reconstruction. As a first step about 3,000 cubic metres (110,000 cu ft) of cut stone and rubble were cleared by German prisoners of war. Some further damage was caused to carvings and decorations in the process. Specialized workers undertook urgent reinforcements of masonry, and parts of damaged sculptures were stored for later restoration. A temporary roof was built to protect the structure from weather, covered by fibro-cement and Ruberoid sheeting.

It took 25 years to complete the basic restoration. The surviving 13th-century stained glass windows were reinstalled in 1948, with modern windows made by Hector de Pétigny (1904–92) to replace those that were missing, The restored basilica was reopened for worship in 1956. The steeple over the transept crossing was only finished in 1983. Further restoration work was undertaken in 2006 to clean the walls and restore the gatehouse to its state at the end of the 17th century.

== Building ==
=== Dimensions ===
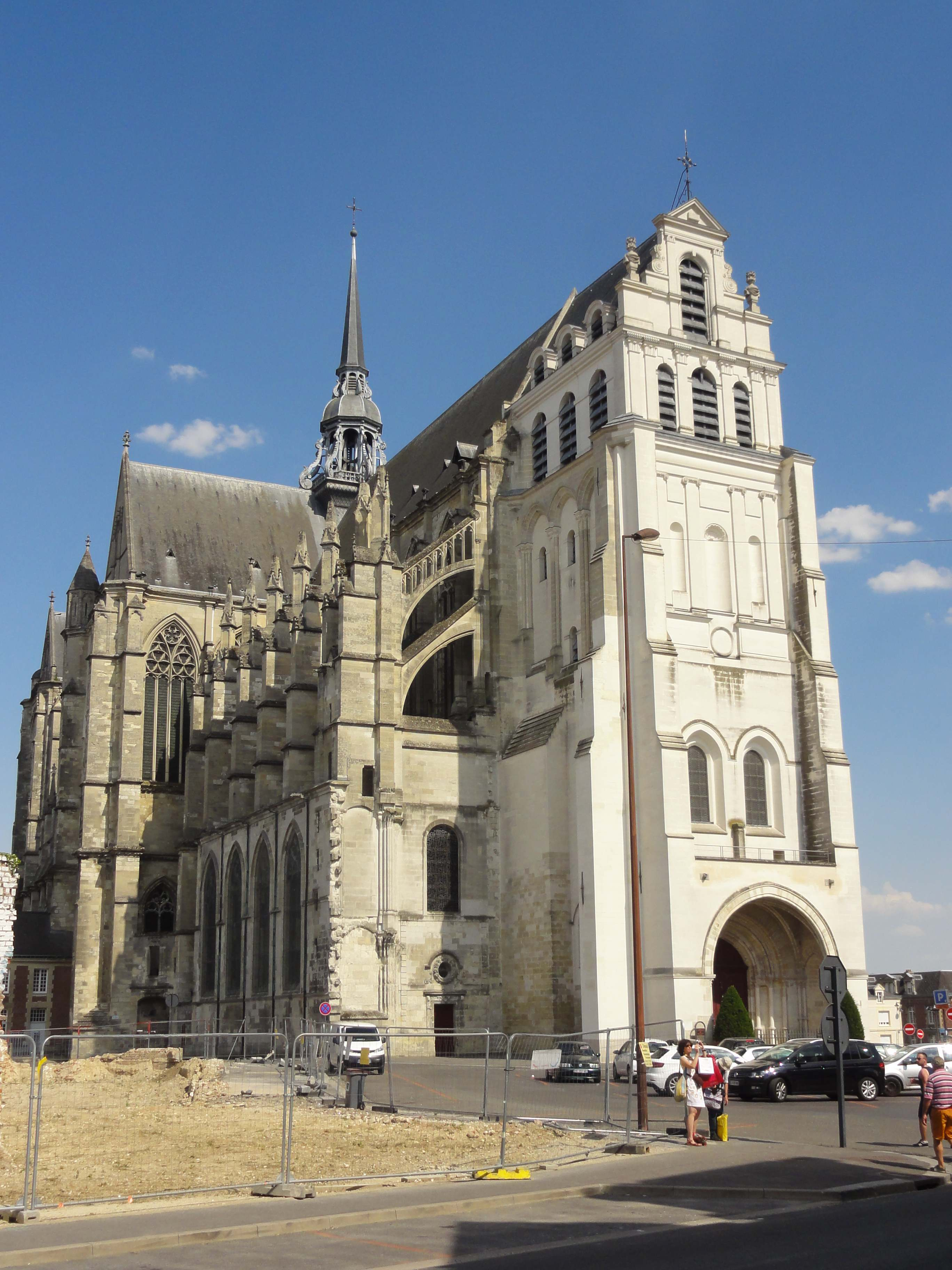
Entrance tower in 2018

The basilica is the largest religious building in Picardy after Amiens Cathedral. It is 133 metres (436 ft) long and 40 metres (130 ft) high. The nave is 42 metres (138 ft) wide. There are 110 windows. The 1976 steeple gives the building 82 metres (269 ft) of height. The entrance tower is 34.5 metres (113 ft) high. The interior is 120 metres (390 ft) long, 36 metres (118 ft) wide, and rises to 34 metres (112 ft) below the vault.

=== Exterior ===
The building has a bold design with flamboyant details. It shows the evolution of the Gothic style during its lengthy construction period. It has a square tower above the transept crossing topped by a slender steeple that was installed in 1983. The entrance to the church dates from the 9th century. It was once part of the Carolingian church, and has been extensively modified. It now has three levels above the semi-circular entrance. There is a chapel dedicated to Saint Michael above the entrance passage. The central section of the building is braced by flying buttresses and by the side aisles. The two transepts, of unequal width, add to the monumental strength of the building. The facade of the north arm is attributed to Gilles Largent, and is notable for its sober composition.

=== Interior ===
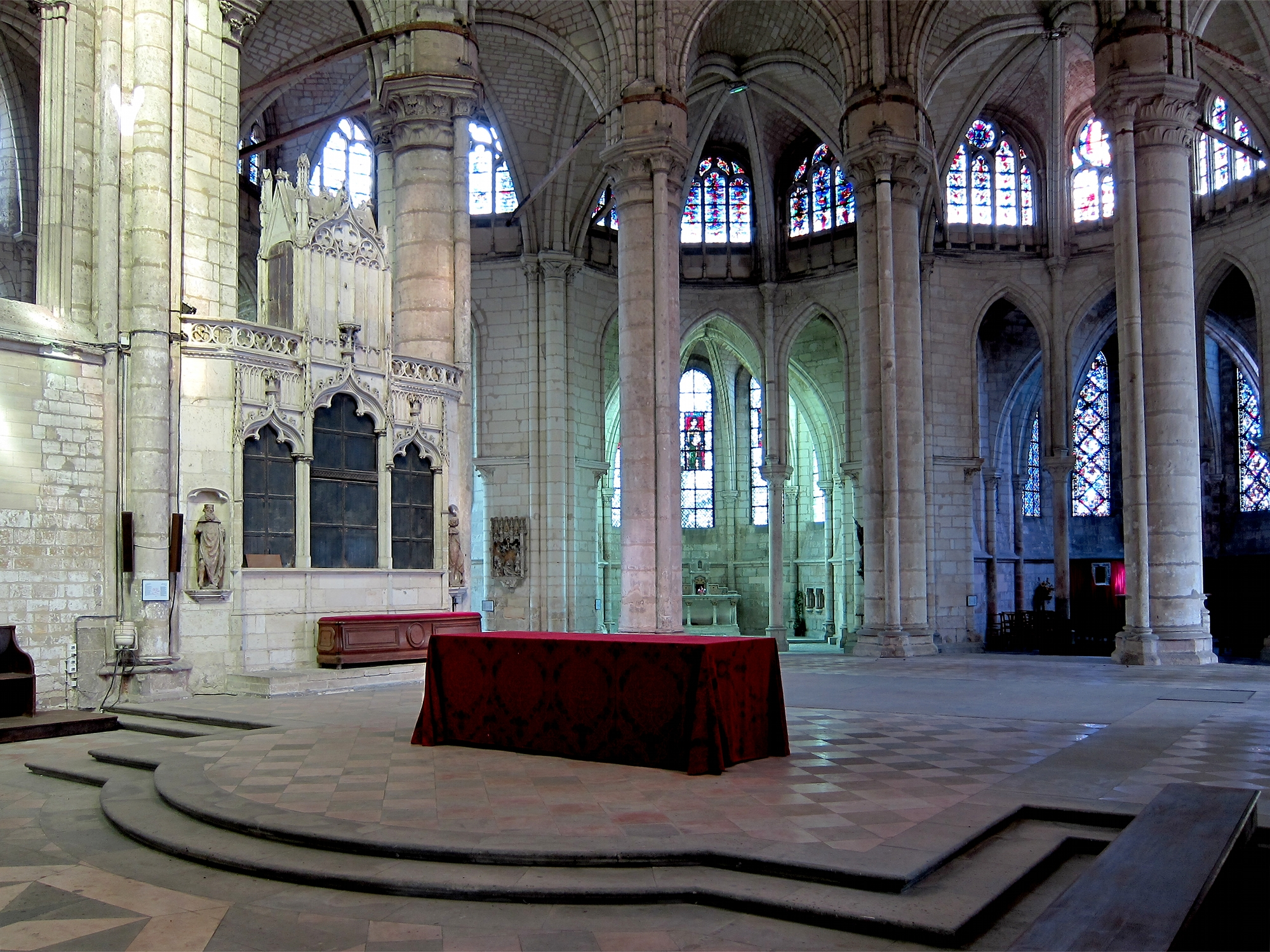
Choir, ambulatory and radiating chapels

The nave is built to a conventional 12th-century plan with three levels: arcades, triforium and high windows. The great high window is crowned by a magnificent star with five branches. The rich medieval decoration of the interior has been lost. The floor of the nave has an octagonal labyrinth of black and white paving stones from the late 15th century, 260 metres (850 ft) in length. The pilgrim was invited to follow the complex course of black stones before opening his soul to God. One wall of the nave has a half relief stone sculpture of the Tree of Jesse, the genealogy of Christ, from the 16th century.

To the east of the main transept there are four straight bays of choir and then a second, narrower transept. The curved structure of the east end extends from this transept. The choir and chevet assembly was probably built between around 1220 to 1257. The double-transept plan is found in the Cluny Abbey church of 1088, but is otherwise very unusual in France. The concept seems to have come from England, where it was becoming popular at the time. The south branch of the small transept was almost ruined in 1460, and was completely rebuilt by Colard Noël in Flamboyant Gothic style. The north branch is mostly the original 13th-century structure, although the windows were remodeled in the 15th century.

The ambulatory has a scalloped eastern wall from which five radiating chapels open. Each chapel is round, with independent dome-like vaulting and is lower than the ambulatory, so a clerestory above the chapels can illuminate the ambulatory. The chapels, built around 1190, are each brightly lit by seven windows. They each open onto the ambulatory through three arches divided by two columns.

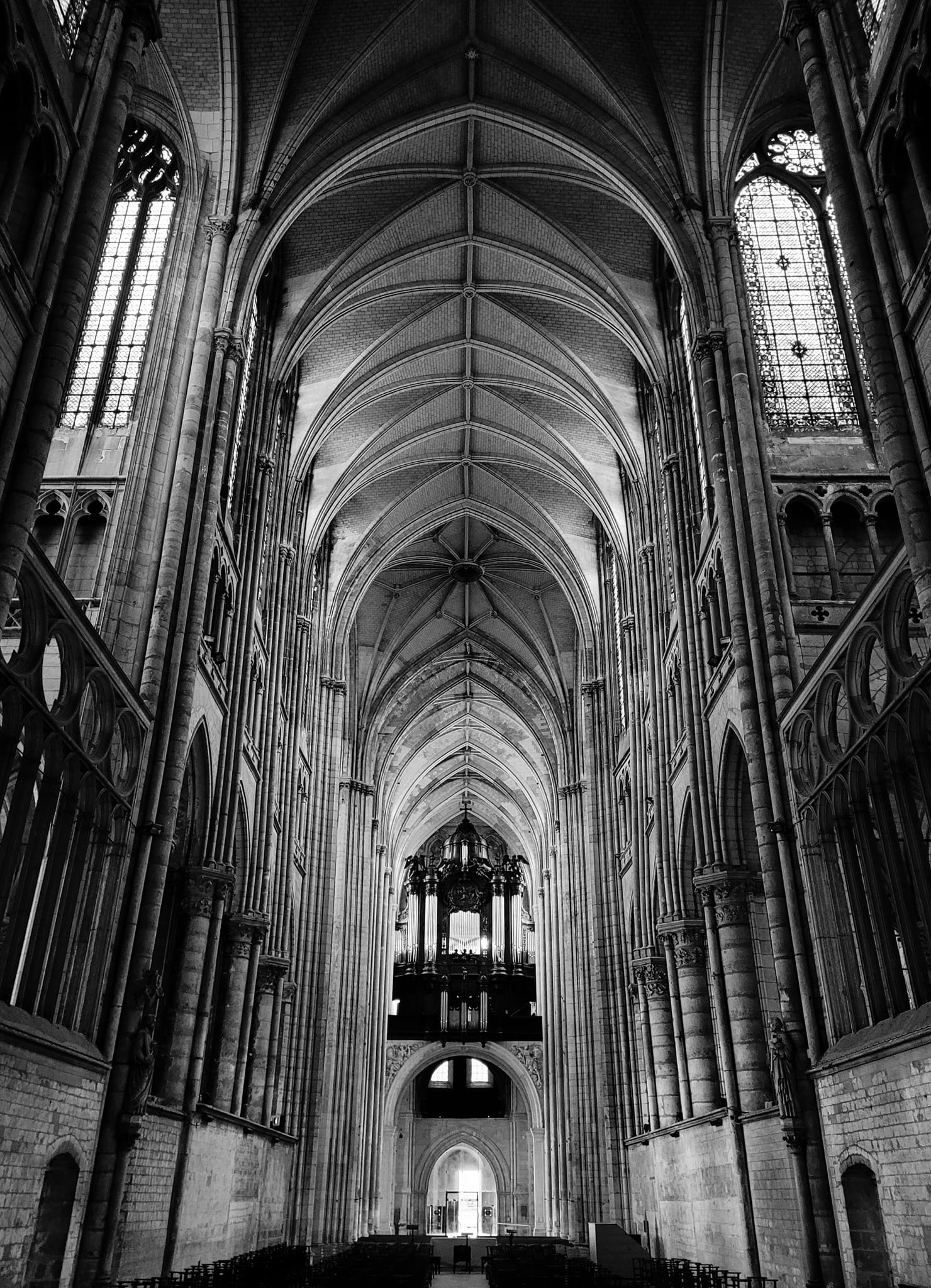
Nave of the basilica of Saint-Quentin, France

=== Organ ===
The organ was completely destroyed by fire in 1669. A new grand organ was donated by Louis XIV, completed in 1703. It fills the space above the last bay of the nave. The organ case was built by Robert Clicquot between 1699 and 1703. The cabinet was drawn by Jean Bérain. Its rich design incorporates large seraphim angels with outstretched wings, cherub musicians and a medallion representing the Assumption of the Virgin supported by two angels. There is a statue of the apostle Quentin on the central turret, executed by Pierre Vaideau, one of the king's carpenters. The support platform was made by the local sculptor Girard de la Motte.

In 1840 Antoine Sauvage, a follower of Aristide Cavaillé-Coll, undertook a full restoration. He installed a Barker machine and made changes that reflected the new romantic aesthetic. In 1917 the piping was melted, the mechanism destroyed and the cabinet seriously damaged. The cabinet was rebuilt during the restoration of the basilica. Haerpfer-Erman of Boulay-Moselle, was given the job of reconstructing the organ in 1961, and the new organ was inaugurated on 27–28 May 1967. It has four keyboards with 61 notes and a pedal with 32 notes.

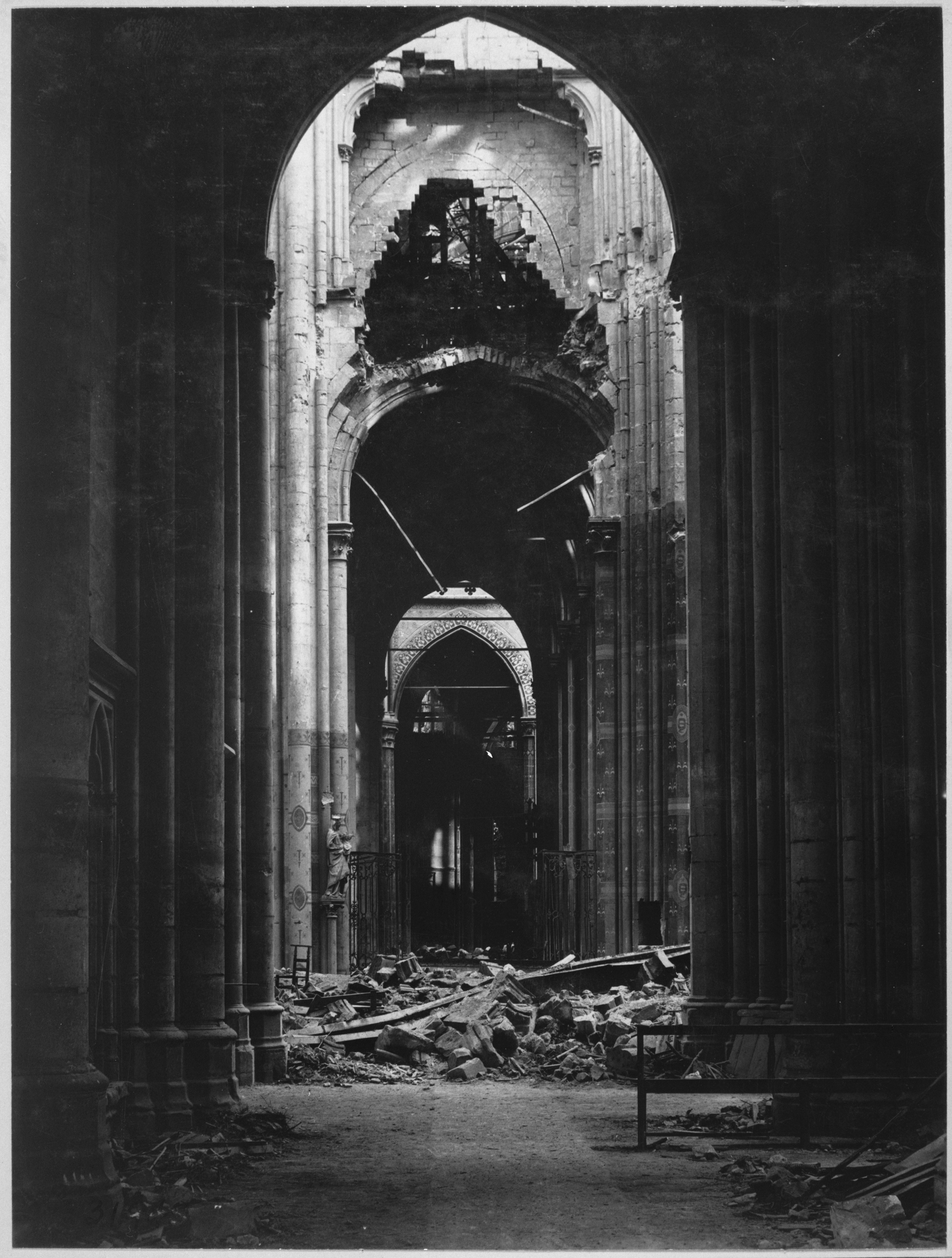
Ruined interior 18 October 1918

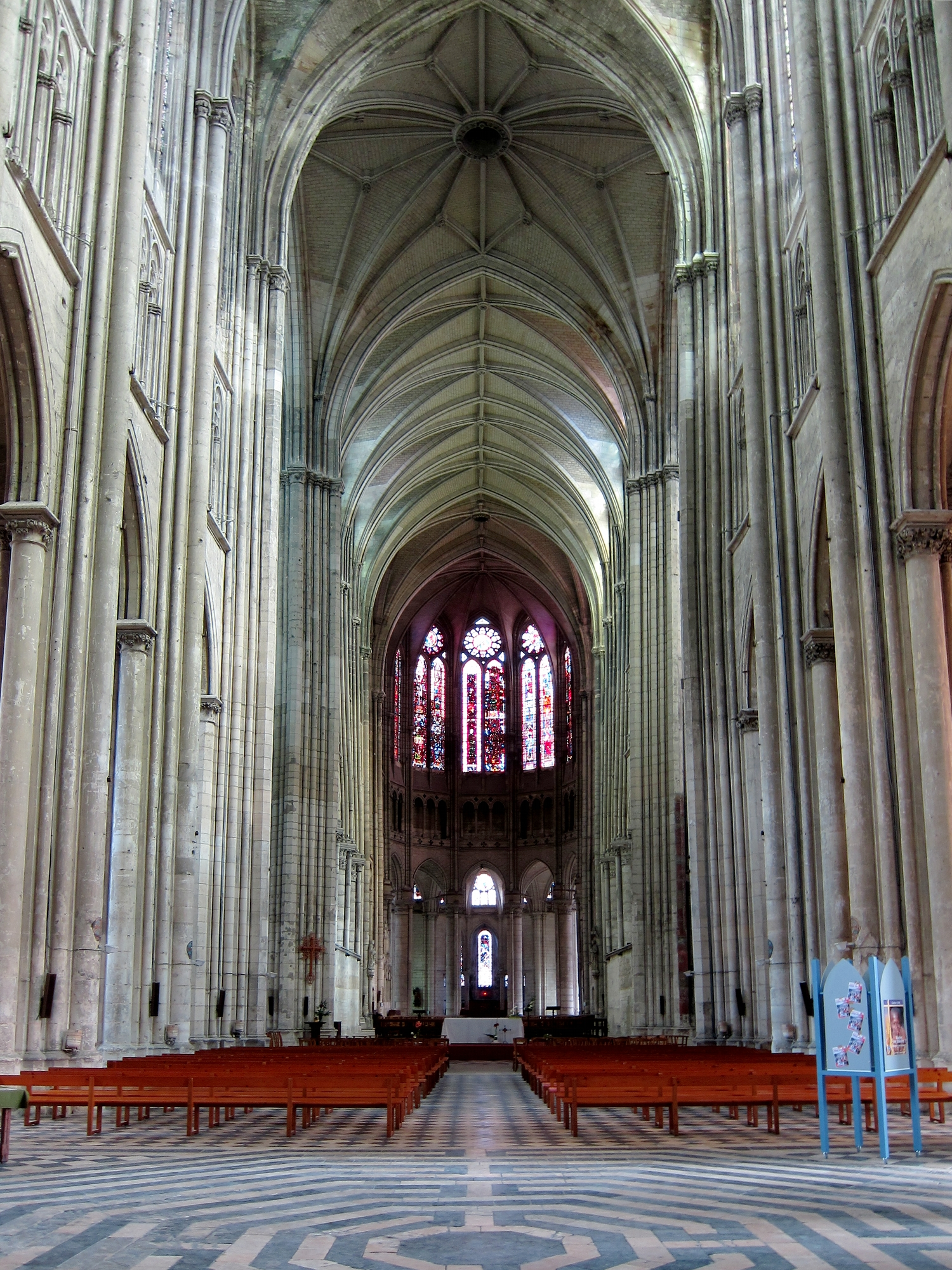
Nave

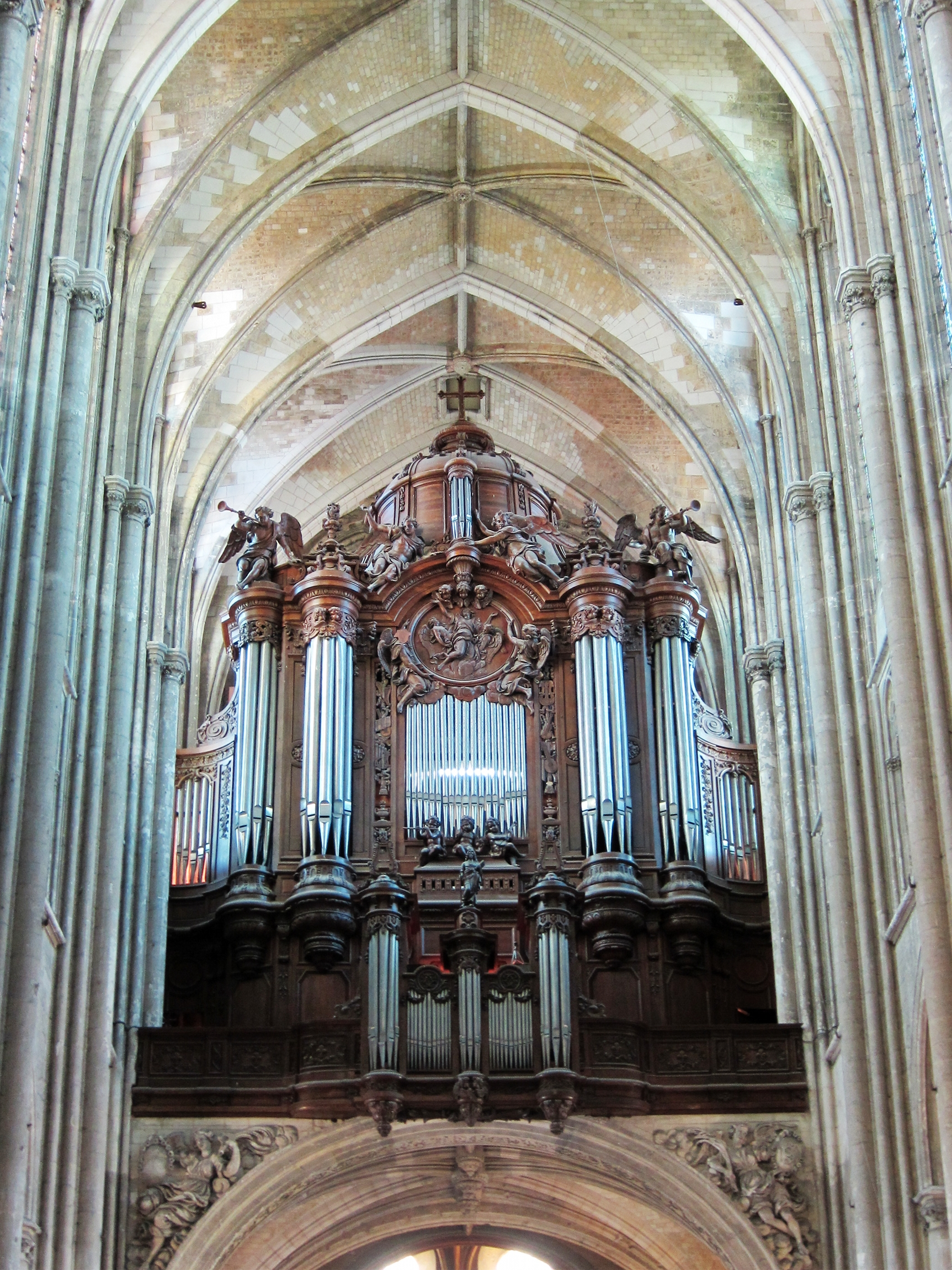
Organ

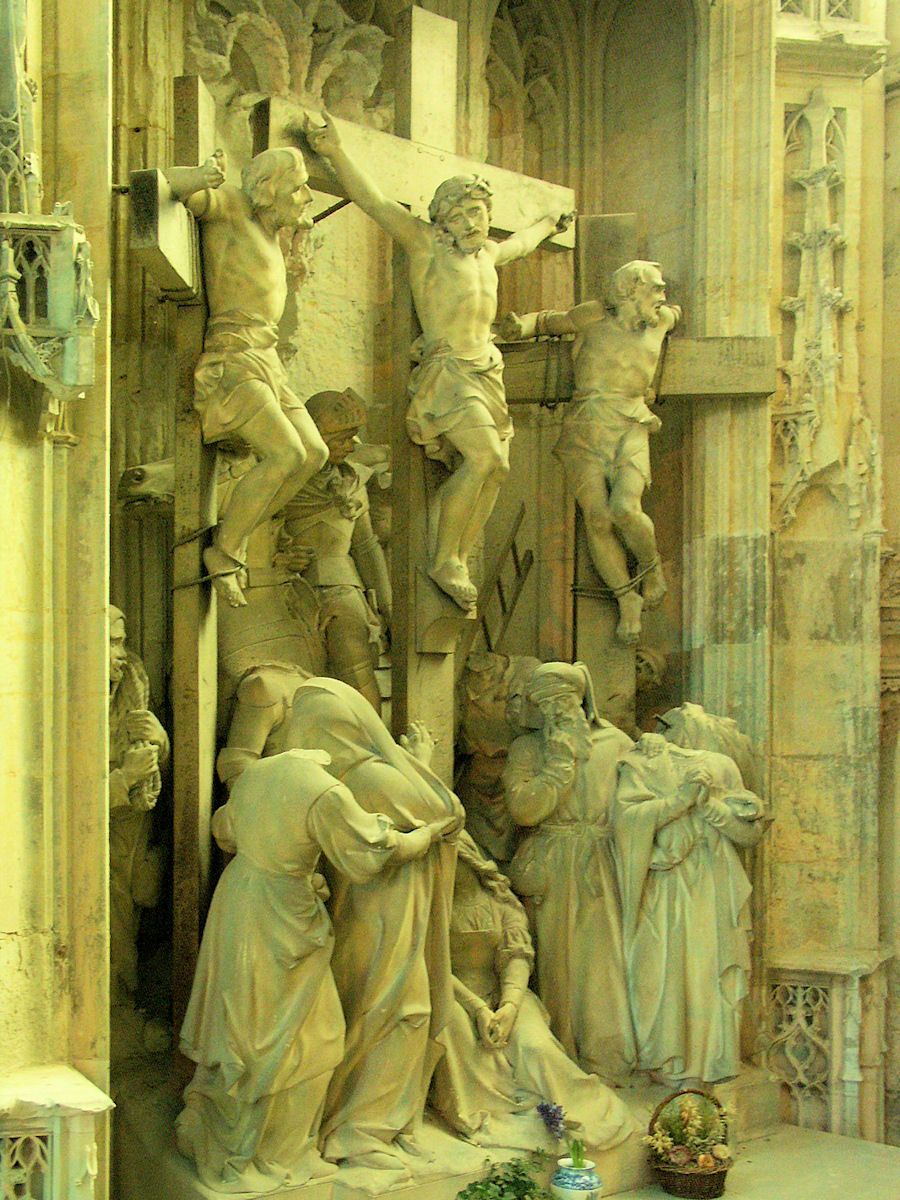
Crucifixion

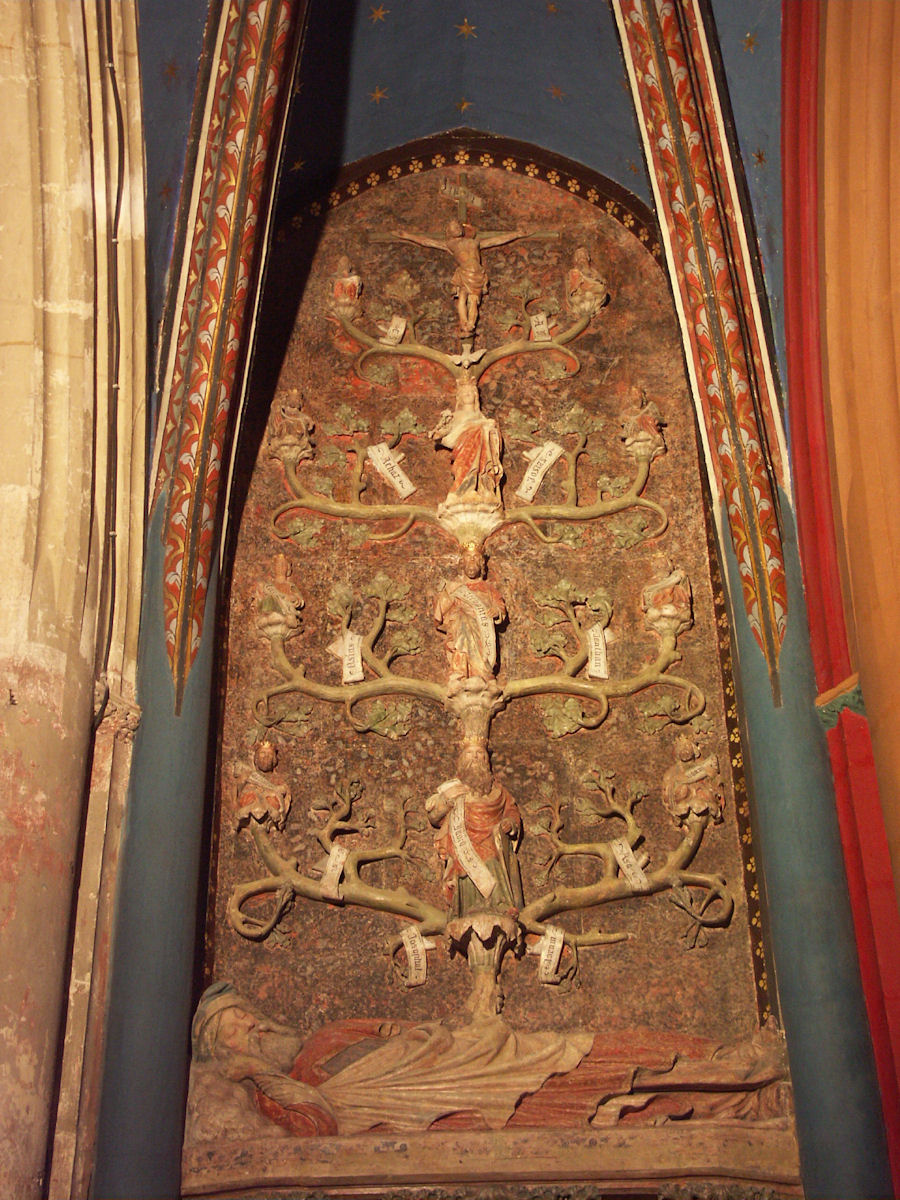
Tree of Jesse

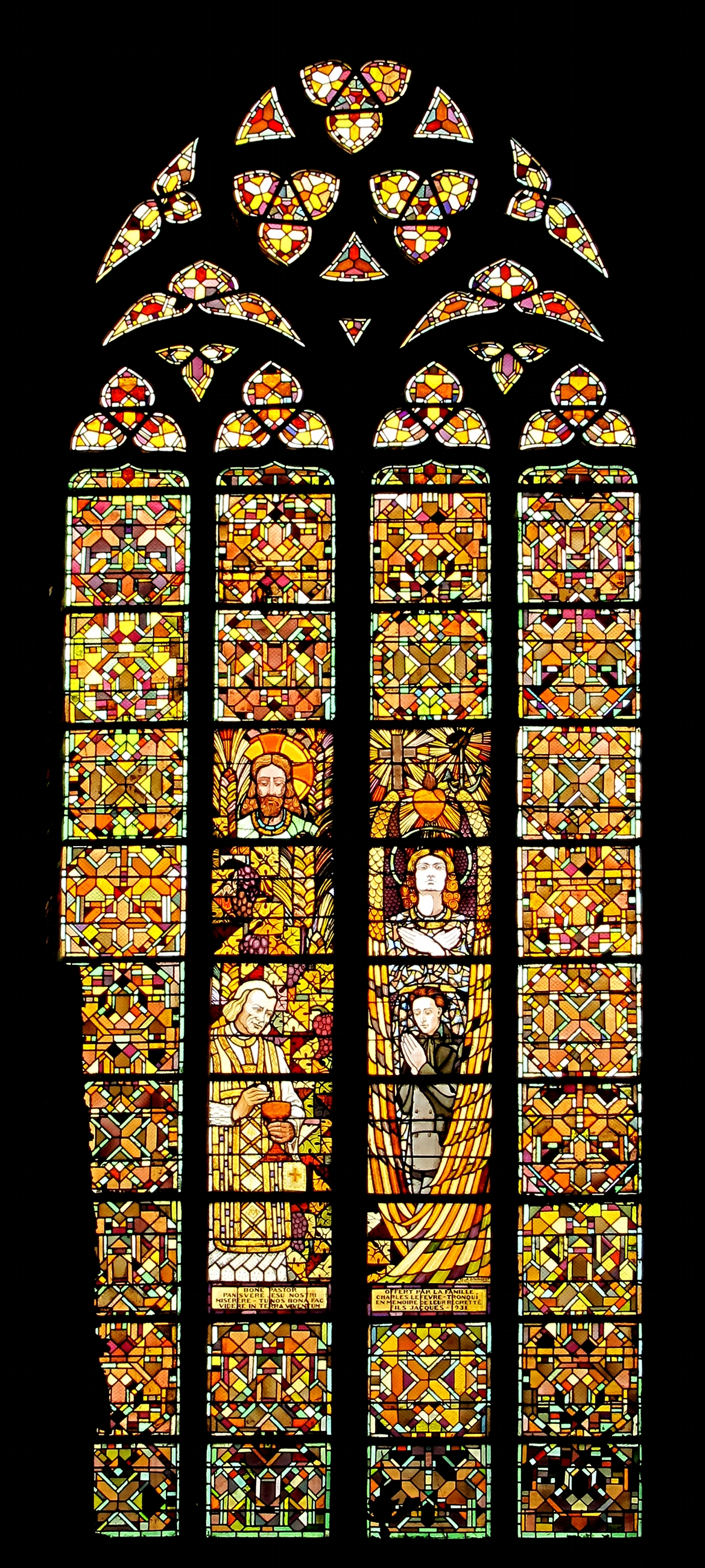
Art Deco window

== Bibliography ==
- Abelard (2015). "Germans in France - Saint Quentin Cathedral".
- "Basilique Saint-Quentin". Orgues en France.
- Bony, Jean (1983). French Gothic Architecture of the 12th and 13th Centuries. University of California Press. ISBN 978-0-520-05586-5.
- Guiochon, Xavier-Philippe (2015). "Basilique de Saint-Quentin". PICARDIA, l'encyclopédie picarde (in French). Région Picardie.
- Kibler, William W. (1995). Medieval France: An Encyclopedia. Psychology Press. ISBN 978-0-8240-4444-2.
- "La Basilique de Saint-Quentin" (in French). Tourisme du Saint-Quentinois. Archived from the original on 2015-11-01.
- Nolan, Kathleen; Sandron, Dany (2015-06-28). Arts of the Medieval Cathedrals: Studies on Architecture, Stained Glass and Sculpture in Honor of Anne Prache. Ashgate Publishing, Ltd. ISBN 978-1-4724-4055-6.
- Pohl, Benjamin (2015-06-18). Dudo of Saint-Quentin's Historia Normannorum: Tradition, Innovation and Memory. Boydell & Brewer Ltd. ISBN 978-1-903153-54-3.
- "Saint-Quentin Basilique". Les orgues de Picardie (in French).
- Sapin, Christian (2005). "Saint-Quentin (Aisne), la collégiale et la crypte de la basilique". Bulletin du Centre d'Études Médiévales d'Auxerre (in French). 9 (9). doi:10.4000/cem.664.
- Shortell, Ellen (1996). "Saint-Quentin, Collégiale Saint-Quentin". Mapping Gothic France. Media Center for Art History, Columbia University. Archived from the original on 2015-09-08.
- Shortell, Ellen M. (1997). "Dismembering Saint Quentin: Gothic Architecture and the Display of Relics". Gesta. 36 (1): 32–47. doi:10.2307/767277. JSTOR 767277. S2CID 156907399.
