= 384 Burdigala =

Main-belt asteroid

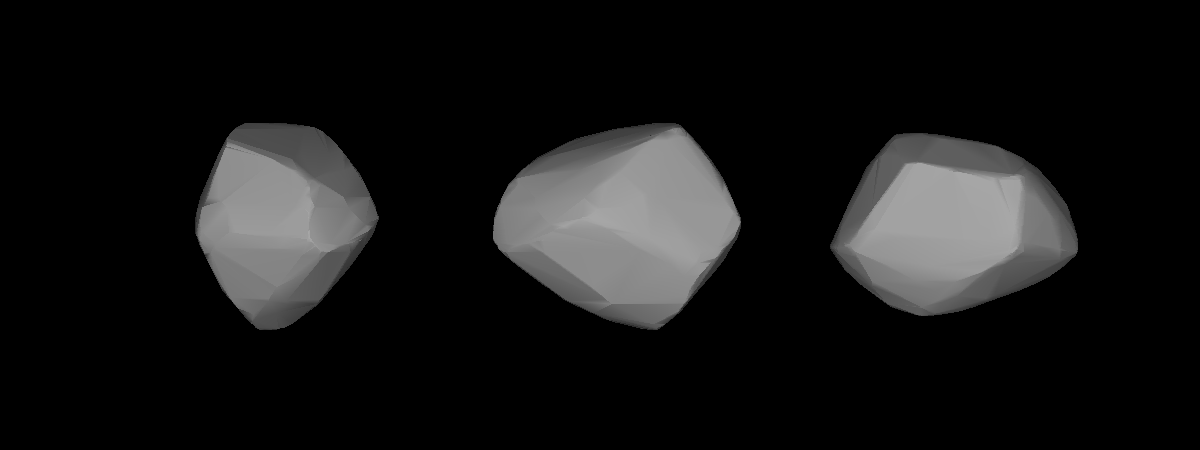
- Lightcurve-base 3D-model of 384 Burdigala.

Discovery
- Discovered by: F. Courty
- Discovery date: 11 February 1894

Designations
- Pronunciation: /bərˈdɪɡələ/
- Named after: Bordeaux
- Alternative designations: 1894 AV
- Minor planet category: Main belt

Orbital characteristics
- Epoch 31 July 2016 (JD 2457600.5)
- Uncertainty parameter 0
- Observation arc: 116.91 yr (42702 d)
- Aphelion: 3.04508 AU (455.537 Gm)
- Perihelion: 2.25578 AU (337.460 Gm)
- Semi-major axis: 2.65043 AU (396.499 Gm)
- Eccentricity: 0.14890
- Orbital period (sidereal): 4.32 yr (1576.1 d)
- Mean anomaly: 173.217°
- Mean motion: 0° 13^{m} 42.305^{s} / day
- Inclination: 5.59096°
- Longitude of ascending node: 47.8387°
- Argument of perihelion: 35.0366°

Physical characteristics
- Dimensions: 36.93±2.4 km
- Synodic rotation period: 21.1 h (0.88 d)
- Geometric albedo: 0.1805±0.025
- Absolute magnitude (H): 9.64

384 Burdigala is a typical Main belt asteroid. It was discovered by F. Courty on 11 February 1894 in Bordeaux. It was the first of his two asteroid discoveries. The other was 387 Aquitania. Burdigala is the Latin name of the city of Bordeaux.
