= Charles Wolf (astronomer) =

French astronomer (1827–1918)

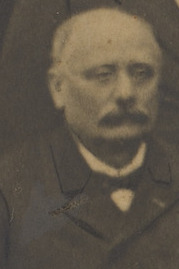
- Charles Wolf, 1887
- Born: 9 November 1827
- Died: 4 July 1918 (aged 90)
- Scientific career
- Fields: Astronomy
- Thesis: De l'Influence de la température sur les phénomènes qui se passent dans les tubes capillaires (1856)

Charles Joseph Étienne Wolf (9 November 1827 in Vorges – 4 July 1918) was a French astronomer.

In 1862, Urbain Le Verrier offered him a post as assistant at the Paris Observatory.

In 1867 he and Georges Rayet discovered Wolf–Rayet stars.

He was elected to the positions of vice-president (1897) and president (1898) of the French Academy of Sciences.
