= Bordeaux Observatory =

French observatory

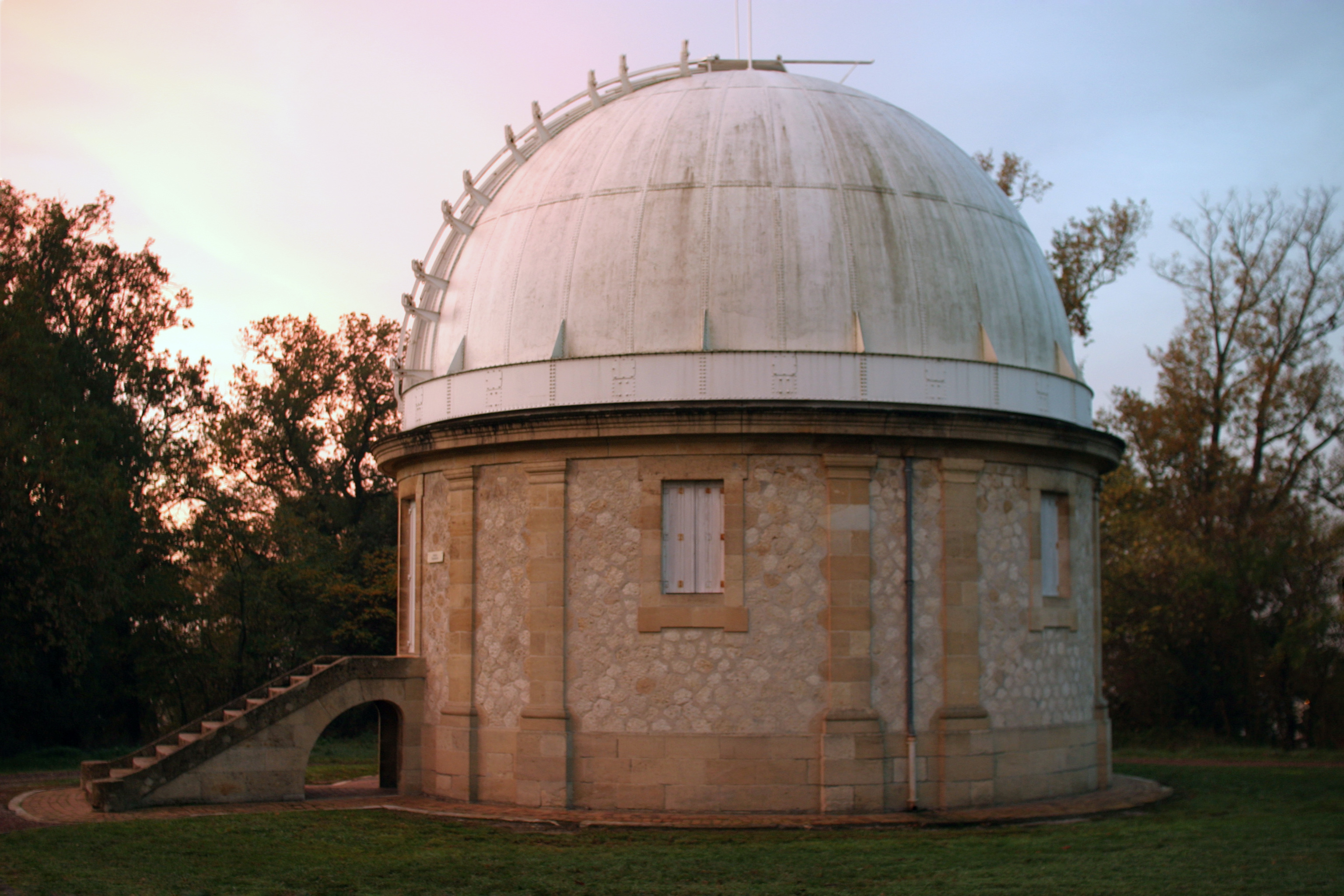
- The dome of the "Grand équatorial" at Bordeaux Observatory, 2006
- Observatory code: 999
- Location: Floirac, canton of Floirac, arrondissement of Bordeaux, Gironde, Nouvelle-Aquitaine, metropolitan France, France
- Coordinates: 44°50′06″N 0°31′34″W
- Established: 1877
- Closed: 2016
- Telescopes: Bordeaux observatory würzburg radar
- Related media on Commons

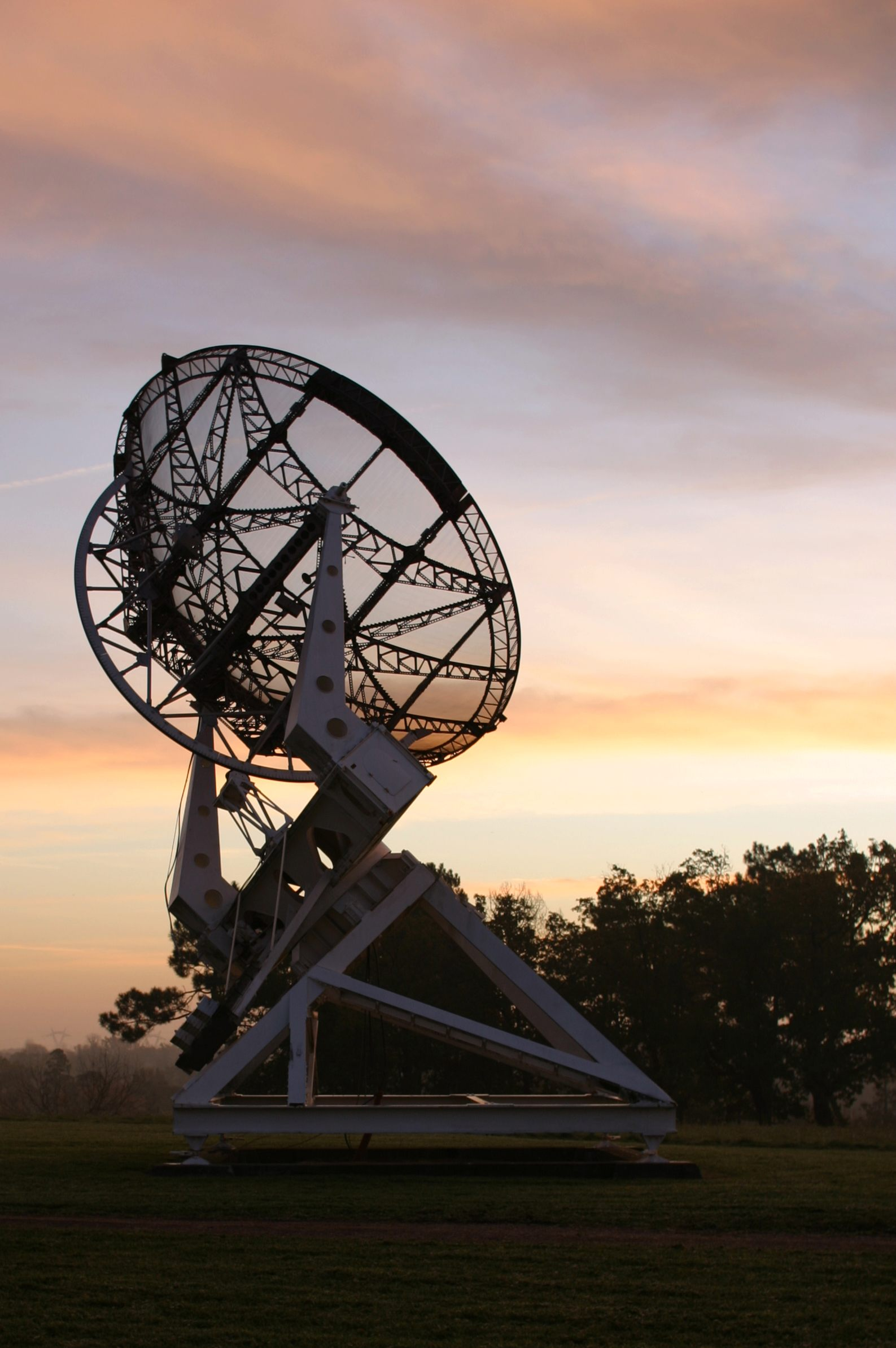
The site has many historical items, including a preserved 1940s radar dish

The Bordeaux Observatory is an astronomical observatory affiliated with the University of Bordeaux. Built in Floirac, France in 1893 its lenses were focused between +11 and +17 degrees declination. Until 1970 it had taken over 4,000 photographic plates. Bordeaux Observatory is home to a large collection of instruments and archives from well over a century of astronomical activities. Until the 2016 it was actively used until the institution moved to a new location at the university. In the French language the name is Observatoire de Bordeaux.

== Early history ==
In the late 18th century an attempt to establish Bordeaux Observatory was made after the Transit of Venus. This led to a house being set aside as the Bordeaux Observatory, however, it was not equipped with any instruments. Although it did not really get established, it carried the banner of desire for a real observatory in the area for a century. Finally, in 1876 an agreement between the Government and the city was reached to establish a real observatory. The Government was trying to execute on a national agenda of increased education, and this nexused with city's desire for an Observatory; Bordeaux would contribute 100,000 francs for its founding.

It was founded in 1879 on a hill overlooking the Garonne river.

The Bordeaux observatory was established in the late 1870s, and one of its first instruments was a Meridian circle. The instrument was built by Eichens with and glass objective of 19 cm by Henry. Also, an equatorial mounted refractor (glass lens) with 38 cm lens. The objective lens was made by Merz, and the mounting was done by Gautier and Eichens. Also a 13-inch (32 cm) aperture astrograph in support of the Carte du Ciel project.

On founding, the observatory had the following areas of study:

- Magnetic and meteorological observations
- Meridian observations—this had to do mostly with star positions)
- Equatorial observations— observations with the telescopes such as of comets, asteroids, moons of the Solar System, and stars
- Computations — such as for publications of meteorological catalogs

Early work with the Meridian included updates to the Argelander-Öltzen star catalog.

== 1900s ==
In the late 20th century Bordeaux Observatory became active in field of radio astronomy. In 1967 the construction of millimeter wave interferometer was begun, in conjunction with others.

Between 1983 and 1988, the automatic meridian circle of Bordeaux Observatory was used in support of the Hipparcos space observatory. The success of that space mission was on factor leading to demise of the utility of automatic meridian circles, because of the extreme accuracy achieved by Hipparcos for that time period.

In 1990 a microwave radiometer for measuring ozone was established at the Observatory.

In 1999, Bordeaux Observatory became a site for IVS.

== 2000s ==
In early 21st century it remained the site for the Laboratoire d'Astrophysique of Bordeaux, but that institution planned to move out from the site.

In 2016, an astronomer of Bordeaux Observatory noted on a possible formation mechanism for "Planet Nine", a hypothesized planet beyond the Kuiper belt in the 2010s. In a simulation of solar system formation, they suggested that it could be leftover building block of an earlier time.

As an institution the Bordeaux Observatory became the Observatoire Aquitain des Sciences de l’Univers (OASU). In 2016, the staff moved from Floirac facilities to a new building at the University of Bordeaux in Pessac.

== See also ==
- List of astronomical observatories
- University of Bordeaux
