= Georges Rayet =

French astronomer (1839–1906)

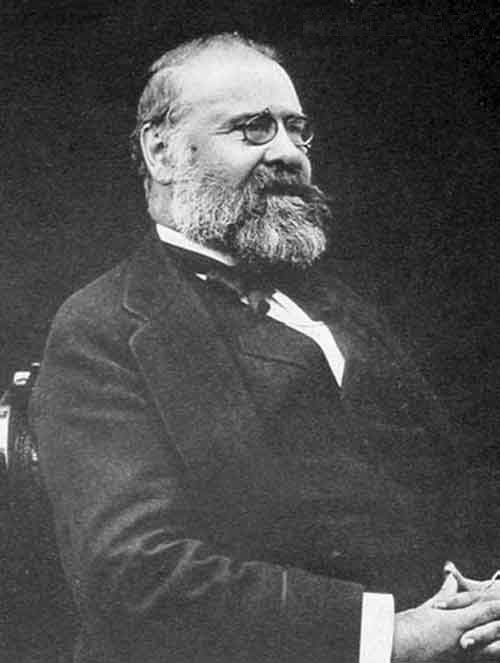
Georges Antoine Pons Rayet

Georges-Antoine-Pons Rayet (12 December 1839 – 14 June 1906) was a French astronomer.

He was born in Bordeaux, France. He began working at the Paris Observatory in 1863. He worked on meteorology in addition to astronomy. He specialized in what was then the new field of spectroscopy.

He was the founder and director of the Bordeaux Observatory for more than 25 years until his death.

Rayet discovered Wolf–Rayet stars together with Charles Wolf in 1867 using a spectroscope the pair had made with an emission spectrum, rather than using absorption spectroscopy which was more typical for the time.

He was awarded the Janssen Medal from the French Academy of Sciences in 1891.

== Obituaries ==
- AN 172 (1906) 111//112 (in French)
- ApJ 25 (1906) 53
- Obs 29 (1906) 332 (one paragraph)
- PASP 18 (1906) 280 (one sentence)
