= B324 =

Star in the Triangulum Galaxy

- B324 is the brightest star in the image. Credit: NASA/ESA Hubble

Observation data Epoch J2000.0 Equinox ICRS
- Constellation: Triangulum
- Right ascension: 01^{h} 33^{m} 55.93272^{s}
- Declination: 30° 45′ 30.4452″
- Apparent magnitude (V): 14.683

Characteristics
- Evolutionary stage: Yellow hypergiant
- Spectral type: A8–F0Ia
- B−V color index: 0.428

Astrometry
Proper motion (μ)	RA: 0.066±0.029 mas/yr Dec.: 0.007±0.020 mas/yr
Parallax (π)	-0.1049±0.0259 mas
Distance	2,700,000 ly
Absolute magnitude (M_{V})	–10.2
Absolute bolometric magnitude (M_{bol})	–10.1

Details
Radius	484 - 642 R_{☉}
Luminosity	863,000 - 875,000 L_{☉}
Temperature	6,970 - 8,000 K

Other designations
- LGGS J013355.96+304530.6

Database references
SIMBAD	data

B324 is a yellow hypergiant in the Triangulum Galaxy, located near the giant H II region IC 142 around 2.7 million light years away. It is the brightest star in the Triangulum Galaxy in terms of apparent magnitude.

== Discovery ==
B324 was first observed in the 1850s, long before different galaxies were known to exist, as it appeared on Bindon Stoney's 1850 – 1851 drawings of its galaxy.

The star has been first catalogued in 1980 by Humphreys and Sandage. The star was found to be the brightest star in the galaxy. It was given the spectral type A5eIa and it was considered a blue supergiant with emission lines.

== Physical properties ==
In 1980 the star was already known as a very luminous star. The absolute visual magnitude was estimated to be -9.4, making it brighter than any other blue supergiant. Later in 1990 and 1996 two papers obtained an even higher absolute magnitude of -10 and a luminosity of 787,000 L_{☉}.

The star has a P Cygni profile. This is commonly thought to be a characteristic of luminous blue variables. However, it is present in some other stars with high mass-loss rates, such as IRC +10420. Notably its luminosity is similar to that of LBVs like S Doradus during an outburst. It also shares some characteristics with the A-type hypergiant HD 33579.

The star was first suggested to be a star similar to S Doradus in 1995 based on the spectral similarities to Var B. Independently a year later a different study came to the same conclusion based on the spectral variation and the profile. It was given the spectral type F0-F5Ia^{+}.

A 2004 study has rejected this classification based on the lack of variability in this star.

In 2012 a study found that the star is more similar to cool LBVs than to yellow hypergiants based on spectral variation, recent circumstellar ejecta and the very high luminosity (which the paper estimated to be 2 million L_{☉}, significantly above the Humphreys-Davidson limit for stars with temperatures comparable to those of the star. While this would imply that the star has stayed in an outburst state for around 20 years, some stars have stayed in this state for even longer.

However, a 2013 paper casts doubt on this classification. The Ca II and [Ca II] emission is strong and the star shows little variability, making it similar to the post-RSG IRC +10420. B324 also has small near-infrared excess. The high derived luminosity was based on a large distance to M33 and the luminosity was revised to 863,000 L_{☉}. Other similarities to the yellow hypergiant mentioned above include the similar absorption line spectra. The star's temperature was estimated to be 8,000 K and the spectral type A8-F0Ia was assigned to this star.

A 2016 paper got a similar luminosity for the star (873,000 L_{☉}) and a slightly lower temperature of 6,970 K.

In 2017 it has been suggested that the star might be evolving to cooler temperatures instead, suggesting that the star has never been a red supergiant yet.

The same year a paper supporting the post-RSG classification has been published, such as the small ^{12}C/^{13}C ratio and the Na I emission, present in Rho Cassiopeiae, HR 8752 and other yellow hypergiants.
