= RW Cephei =

Hypergiant star in the constellation Cepheus

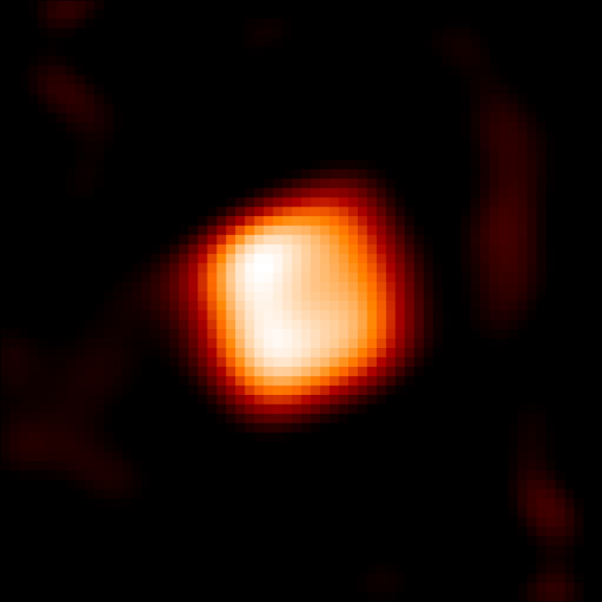
- CHARA/MIRC-X image of RW Cephei in the H-band during the "great dimming", revealing a box-like shape and a dark patch on the western side of the star

Observation data Epoch J2000.0 Equinox ICRS
- Constellation: Cepheus
- Right ascension: 22^{h} 23^{m} 07.01521^{s}
- Declination: +55° 57′ 47.6244″
- Apparent magnitude (V): 6.0–7.6

Characteristics
- Evolutionary stage: Red, orange or yellow hypergiant
- Spectral type: K2 0-Ia (G8 - M2Ia-0)
- Apparent magnitude (K): 1.88
- U−B color index: 2.38
- B−V color index: 2.22
- Variable type: SRd

Astrometry
Radial velocity (R_{v})	−56.00 km/s
Proper motion (μ)	RA: −3.606 mas/yr Dec.: −2.881 mas/yr
Parallax (π)	0.1140±0.0342 mas
Distance	12,790+550 −510 ly (3,921+168 −157 pc)
Absolute magnitude (M_{V})	−8.0 – −9.4

Details
Mass	25 – 40 (initial mass) M_{☉}
Radius	1,100±44 R_{☉}
Luminosity	300,000 – 540,000 L_{☉}
Surface gravity (log g)	0.2 cgs
Temperature	4,200–4,400, 3,900 (during the dimming) K
Metallicity [Fe/H]	+0.17±0.20 dex

Other designations
- RW Cep, AAVSO 2219+55A, BD+55°2737, HD 212466, HIP 110504, SAO 34387

Database references
SIMBAD	data

RW Cephei is a K-type hypergiant and a semirregular variable star in the constellation Cepheus, at the edge of the Sharpless 132 H II region and close to the small open cluster Berkeley 94. It is among the largest stars known with a radius of 1,100 times that of the Sun (R_{☉}), nearly as large as the orbit of Jupiter.

In 2022, the star underwent a "great dimming" event similar to Betelgeuse.

The temperature intermediate between the red supergiants and yellow hypergiants has led to it being variously considered as a red hypergiant or yellow hypergiant.

== Observational history ==
The first documented sighting of RW Cephei dates back to 1746 when it was included in a star catalog compiled by James Bradley. It has been described as a red star since at least the 1840s, (Note: The exact year of the observation is unknown, but it is believed to have been taken some time between 1841 and 1844) when Friedrich Wilhelm Argelander noted it as "very red" in his catalog. RW Cephei was independently discovered to be variable by Thomas William Backhouse and Henrietta Swan Leavitt in 1899 and 1907 respectively, but has been suspected to be variable by Angelo Secchi since at least 1868. The star was designated RW in 1908, being the fifteenth discovered variable in Cepheus. Analysis of spectra in 1942 revealed RW Cephei to be a highly luminous hypergiant star, appearing more luminous than Mu Cephei. More detailed spectral studies in 1956 and 1972 revealed unique spectral features, setting it apart from the other known hypergiants. Since then, the star has been studied infrequently over the decades. In late 2022, RW Cephei was announced to be undergoing a great dimming event, and it was subsequently observed by the CHARA interferometry array in December.

== Distance ==
The distance to RW Cephei has been estimated on the basis of its spectroscopic luminosity and it is assumed to be a member of the Cepheus OB1 association, placing it within the Perseus Arm of the Milky Way. The Gaia Data Release 2 and Gaia Early Data Release 3 parallaxes lead to distance estimates of 3,416+1,366
−829 pc and 6,666+1,561
−1,006 pc respectively. Cepheus OB1 is generally considered to be at about 3,400 pc. The open cluster Berkeley 94, of which RW Cephei may be a member, is thought to be at a distance of 3,900±110 pc. The star and cluster are part of the larger star-forming region Sh 2-132.

== Variability ==
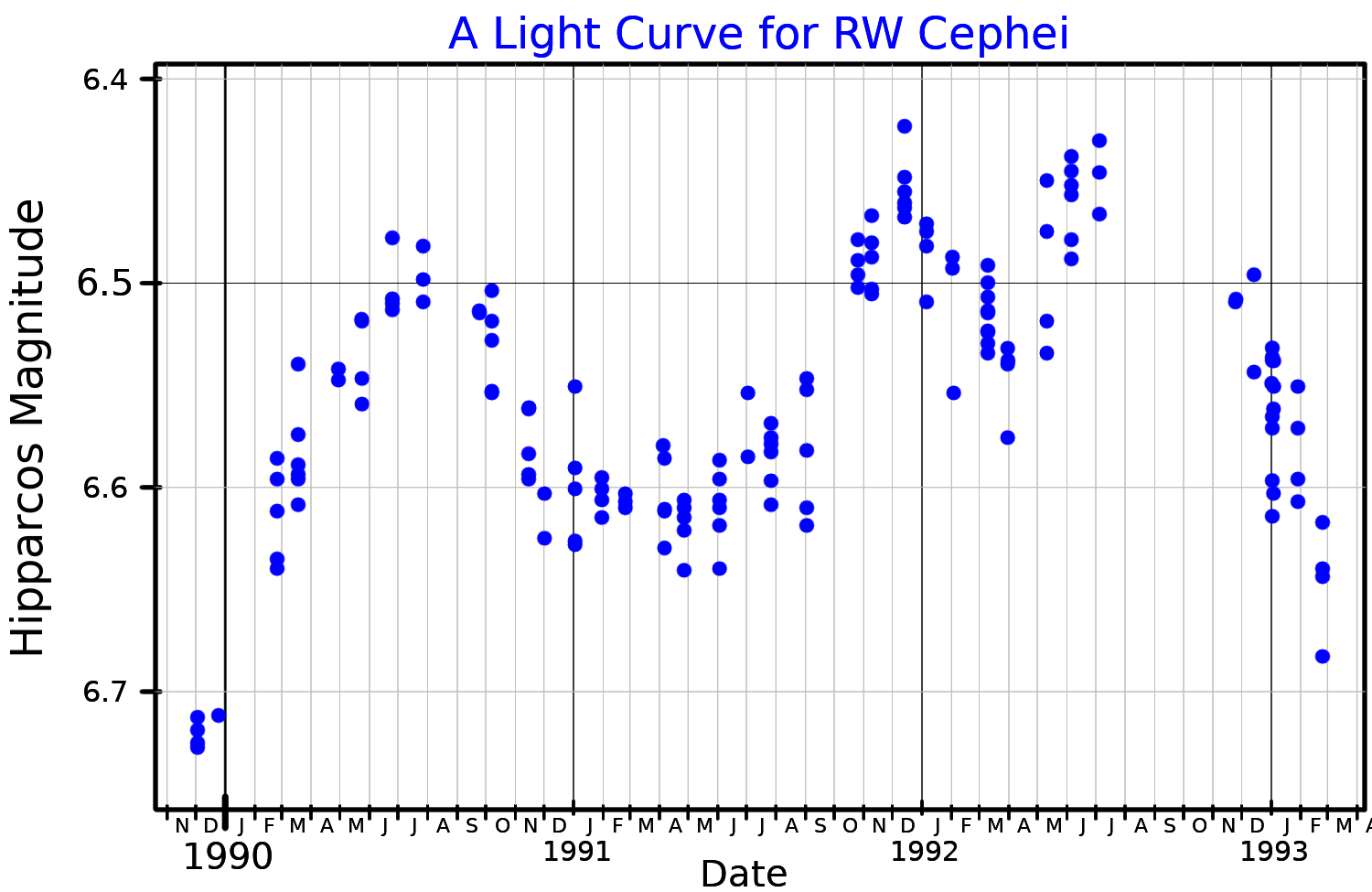
A light curve for RW Cephei, plotted from Hipparcos data

The magnitude range of RW Cephei was given as 8.2–8.8 using photographic plates in the initial report, while later studies found the photographic range to be from 8.6–10.7, noting that maxima and minima cannot be derived with any certainty. Other authors estimate an amplitude of only around 0.5 magnitudes. Modern estimates put the range of variability from 6.0 to 7.6 in the V-band.

RW Cephei has been classified as a semi-regular variable star of type SRd, meaning that it is a slowly varying yellow giant or supergiant. The General Catalogue of Variable Stars cites a 1952 study giving a period of approximately 346 days, while other studies suggest different periods and certainly no strong periodicity.

=== Great dimming ===
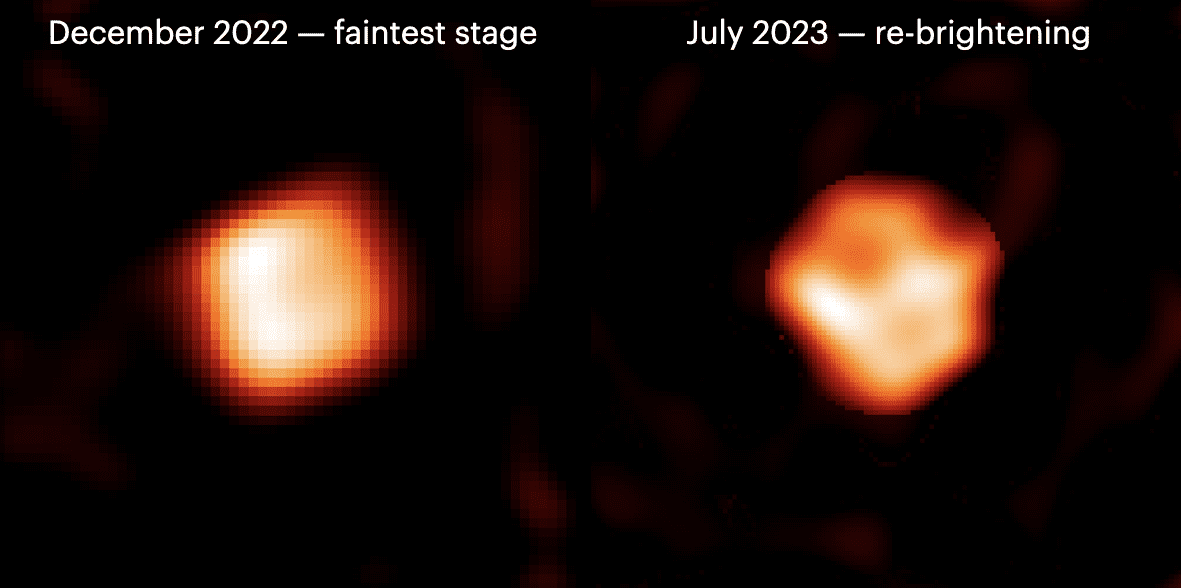
Comparison of CHARA array images taken in December 2022 and July 2023, showing the dimming and subsequent rebrightening of RW Cephei

In December of 2022, the star was reported by two astronomers to be going through a "great dimming", reaching a fainter than usual magnitude of 7.6. It was speculated to be caused by short periods of enhanced mass loss leading to the condensation of dust that partially obscures the stellar photosphere. This was later confirmed by observations with the CHARA array, revealing a dark patch on the western side of the star suggested to be a dust cloud released in a recent surface mass ejection. An unusually bright maximum attained in 2019 right before the dimming was suspected to be caused by an energetic convective upwelling of hot gas, later being expelled and cooling into a dust cloud obscuring the star. The event is compared to the great dimming of Betelgeuse that happened in late 2019 and the dimming events seen in the historical light curve of VY Canis Majoris.

Spectra taken by an amateur astronomer show the appearance of several new emission lines during the dimming, most notably H-α and the K I lines at 766.5 and 769.9 nm. The H-α line is blueshifted by ~40 km/s relative to the star, suggesting the source of the emission is expanding outwards.

Previous observations using photographic plates taken between 1948 and 1951 reveal a similar dimming from magnitude 9.16 down to 9.5, followed by a rapid re-brightening to magnitude 8.9.

== Spectrum ==
RW Cephei displays many complex lines in its spectrum, many of which are stronger and more broad than usual. An initial study in 1956 focusing on the blue spectral region found many metal absorption lines with two components separated by a central maximum, attributed to emission superposed on an absorption line widened due to turbulence. The shortward absorption components were found to be significantly stronger than the longward components, caused by an outward moving shell of gas. A follow-up study in 1972 focusing on redder spectral regions found unusually strong Na D lines too intense to be caused by the interstellar medium. The Fe I line was found to be 30% stronger than in normal K-type supergiants, while the Ti I and V I lines were of the same strength or weaker. With these peculiar spectral features, the star finds no counterpart among the known hypergiants, with only Rho Cassiopeiae displaying remotely similar features.

The spectrum has been classified as early as G8 and as late as M2, but it isn't clear that there has been actual variation. In the first MK spectral atlas, it was listed M0:Ia. RW Cephei was later listed as the standard star for spectral type G8 Ia, then as the standard for K0 0-Ia. Based on the same spectra it was adjusted to the standard star for type K2 0-Ia. Molecular bands characteristic of M-class stars are seen in infrared spectra, but not always in optical spectra.

== Physical properties ==
The temperature of RW Cephei is uncertain, with contradictory excitation strengths in the spectrum. A simple color correlation temperature fit gives temperatures around 3,749 K, while a full spectrum fit gives a temperature of 5,018 K. Another fit using J-band spectral data and MARCS stellar models gives a temperature of 3,770±170 K. This fit also results in a metallicity of [Fe/H] = +0.17±0.20, indicating the star is slightly metal-rich relative to the Sun. A newer study finds a temperature of 4,400 K consistent with its spectral type. Based on the CO line strength at 2.29 μm it is indicated that RW Cephei dropped in temperature from 4,200 K to 3,900 K during the dimming.

Luminosities have been derived on the basis of a membership to Cepheus OB1, with studies finding exceptionally high luminosities of 545,000 L_{☉}, or 468,000 L_{☉}. A more recent study finds a somewhat lower luminosity of 300,000 L_{☉} using the spectral energy distribution of a DUSTY model fit.

Images obtained using the SURFING algorithm result in a limb-darkened angular diameter of 2.45 mas, corresponding to a linear radius of 900–1,760 R_{☉} depending on the adopted distance. In 2024, the star's size was shown to have increased by 8% since its 2022 dimming. The angular diameter, combined with an average distance of 3,935 pc (12,830 ly) to Berkeley 94, gives a radius of 1,100 R_{☉}.

== Surroundings ==
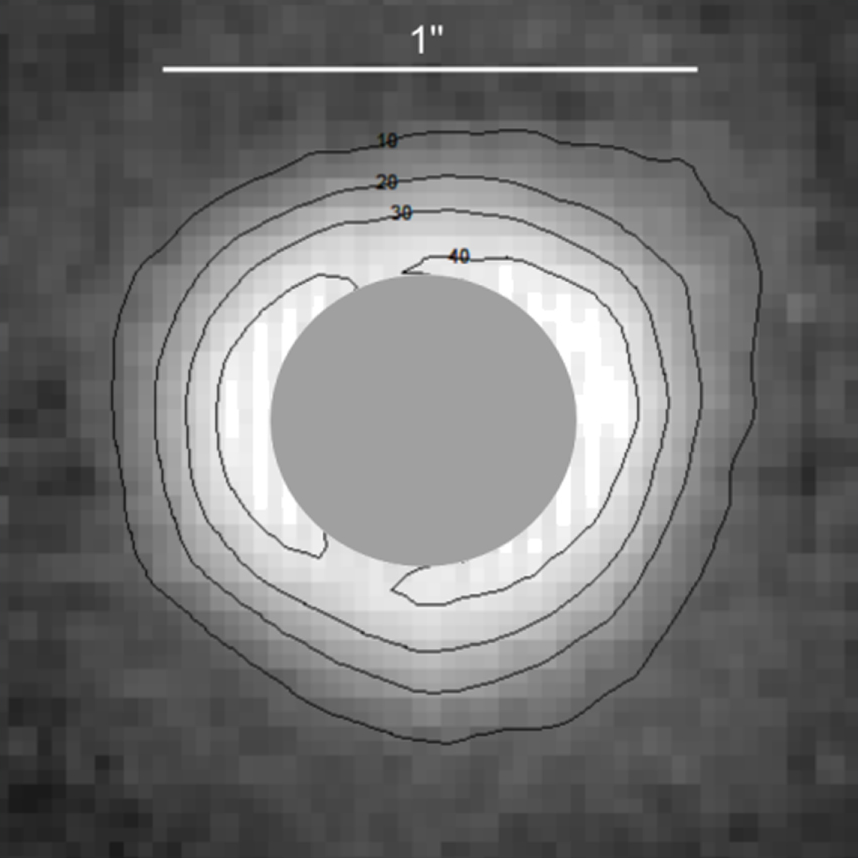
11.9 μm image of the extended emission around RW Cephei

The star shows evidence for a significant amount of circumstellar material in its spectrum. The IRAS low resolution spectrum shows signatures of optically thick silicate emission at 10 and 18 μm, an indication for high amounts of mass loss. Emission in the first-overtone SiO bands was suspected in 1982, and later confirmed using higher resolution spectra showing clear signs of emission at 4.0, 4.04 and 4.08 μm. Direct imaging in mid-infrared bands reveals the source to be extended, having an azimuthally symmetric structure similar to IRC +10420. The radius of this emission has been estimated to be ~0.3–0.4 arcseconds at 11.9 μm, corresponding to a physical radius of ~1,000–1,400 au at a distance of 3.4 kpc.

=== Mass loss ===
The current mass loss rate of RW Cephei has been determined to be ~7×10^{−6} M_{☉}/yr using a DUSTY model fit. A previous study estimated 1.8×10^{−5} M_{☉}/yr using silicate line strengths and adopting a distance of 2.8 kpc. Analysis of the surrounding mid-infrared emission indicates that RW Cephei ended a period of enhanced mass loss ~95–140 years ago, (Note: Assuming a wind velocity of 50 km/s based on values for known red and yellow hypergiants) suggesting that it has left the red supergiant phase and is currently evolving towards hotter temperatures. The current mass loss phase appears to be dominated by several mass ejections, including the observed "great dimming".

== See also ==
- HR 5171, a similar star
- V915 Scorpii, another similar star near WR 85
- Stephenson 2 DFK 49, another similar star
