= HD 271182 =

Yellow hypergiant in the Large Magellanic Cloud

- Location of HD 271182 (circled)

Observation data Epoch J2000 Equinox ICRS
- Constellation: Dorado
- Right ascension: 05^{h} 21^{m} 01.71073^{s}
- Declination: −65° 48′ 02.4207″
- Apparent magnitude (V): 9.620

Characteristics
- Evolutionary stage: Yellow hypergiant
- Spectral type: F8 0
- B−V color index: 0.74
- J−H color index: 0.159
- J−K color index: 0.259
- Variable type: Alpha Cygni variable

Astrometry
Radial velocity (R_{v})	311.9185 km/s
Proper motion (μ)	RA: 1.582±0.013 mas/yr Dec.: 0.382±0.014 mas/yr
Absolute magnitude (M_{V})	−9.4 (Note: Calculated from luminosity of 450,000 L_{☉}.)

Details
Mass	20–30 M_{☉}
Radius	622 (Note: Calculated from effective temperature and luminosity, provided by Glatzel & Kraus (2024).) R_{☉}
Luminosity	450,000 L_{☉}
Temperature	6,000 K

Other designations
- CD−65°320, CPD−65°457, HD 271182, HIP 24988, PPM 354712, TIC 149102791, TYC 8890-934-1, GSC 08890-00934, 2MASS J05210170-6548026, Gaia DR3 4660601611448785152

Database references
SIMBAD	data

HD 271182, occasionally referred to as G266 and R92, is a rare yellow hypergiant (YHG) and an Alpha Cygni variable. It is one of the brightest stars in the Large Magellanic Cloud (LMC), positioned in the deep southern constellation of Dorado. It is receding away from the Sun at a heliocentric radial velocity of +311.9185 km/s, confirming its membership in the LMC. Despite this vast distance from Earth (around 163,000 ly), the star is observable through a small telescope due to its immense luminosity, at an apparent magnitude of 9.6.

== Physical properties ==
The star is extremely luminous, radiating 450,000 times the luminosity of the Sun from its photosphere (L_{☉}). It shines at an effective temperature of approximately 6,000 K (10,340 °F), slightly hotter than the Sun, giving it a yellowish-white hue. Given the temperature and luminosity, its radius can be calculated at around 622 R_{☉}. An evolutionary mass of ~30 M_{☉} from the measured nitrogen-carbon ratio. Glatzel & Kraus (2024) present an initial mass of 32–40 M_{☉} and a current mass of 20–30 M_{☉}.

Given its considerable angular separation from the core of the LMC, the star's distance from Earth is somewhat uncertain even relative to LMC distance estimates. Trigonometric parallax efforts by Gaia have been inconclusive thus far: DR2 estimates 15.7±26.5 μas while EDR3 estimates −3.5±11.3 μas. (The LMC, at around 50 kpc, has a notional parallax of 20 μas; the future DR5 best-case parallax uncertainty will be around 7 μas, which will likely be insufficient to directly measure the distance between the star and the core of the LMC.)

== Spectra and abundances ==
As early as 1960, the star's spectral type was classified as F8Ia, corresponding to a yellow-white "super-supergiant" (a hypergiant in modern terms). The star has weaker hydrogen spectral lines than a normal F8Ia star, which implies a later type, but all the other lines point towards an earlier type between F5Ia and F8Ia. Compared to Delta Canis Majoris, another F8Ia star, it shows a weaker line of neutral iron (Fe I) at 4118.5 Å. The Ca II H and K emission profile closely resembles that of the galactic YHGs Rho Cassiopeiae and V382 Carinae. This indicates similar behavior in their outer atmospheres, such as non-radiative chromospheric heating, mass loss and stellar winds in the order of 1×10^{−6} M_{☉}/yr.

HD 271182 shows no signs of excess infrared emission caused by circumstellar dust. Emission seen in the hydrogen-alpha absorption lines of its Echelle spectra are thought to be caused by atmospheric activity.

The star has a low metallicity of [Fe/H]=−0.50 dex, meaning it only has 10^{−0.50}≈32% the Sun's iron content, which is lower than the LMC average for young stars at around 50%. It is also depleted in carbon and oxygen, but very enhanced in nitrogen ([N/Fe]=1.53 dex).

== Variability ==
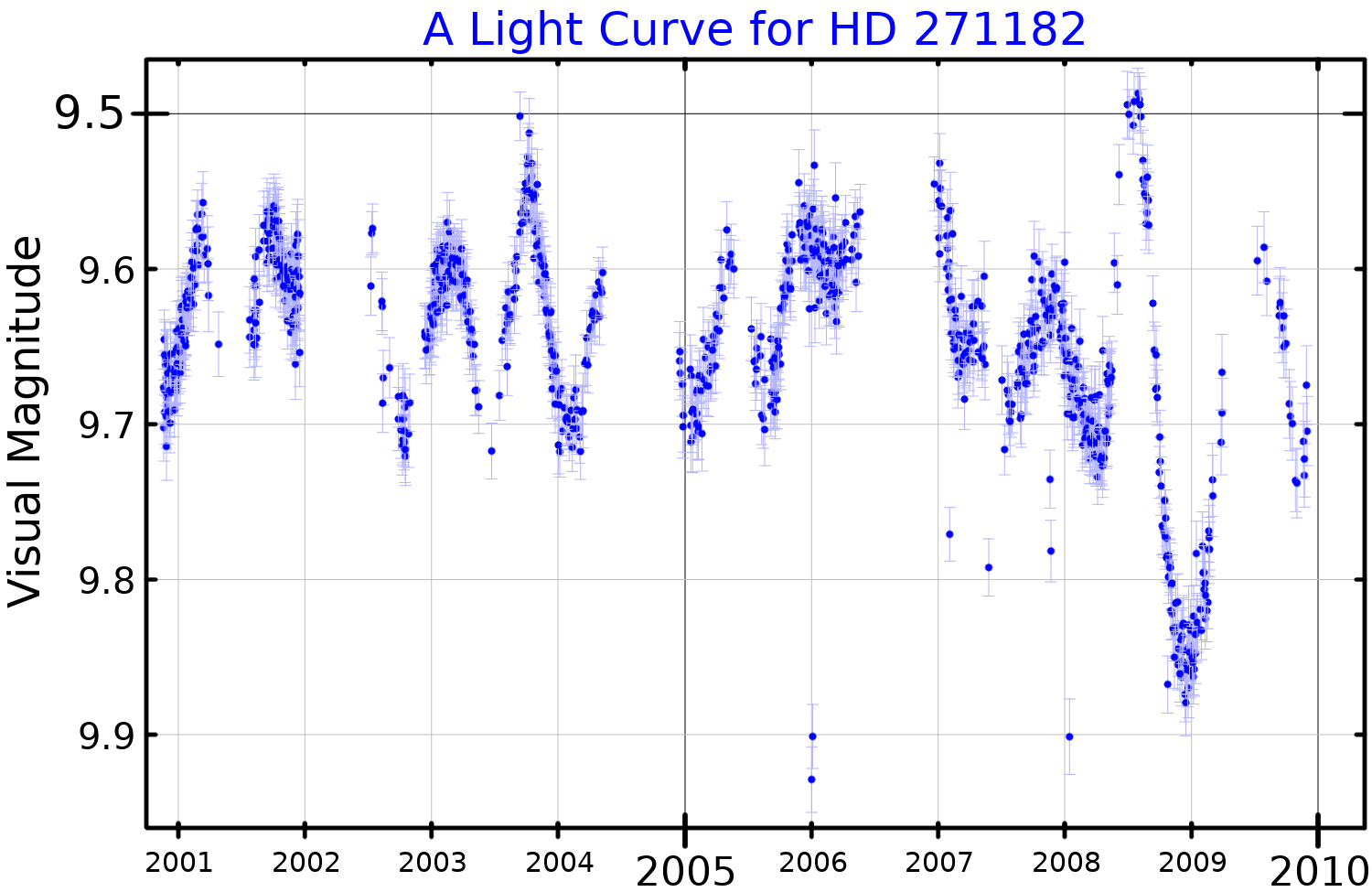
A light curve for HD 271182, plotted from ASAS data.

In 1983, Olin J. Eggen reported that HD 271182 was a pseudo-Cepheid variable, a supergiant in the Hertzsprung gap with less periodic light variations than true Cepheids. This star in particular showed an amplitude of 0.25 mag in the V band. Similarities were noted between it and two other pseudo-Cepheids, namely R Puppis and HD 269879. Grieve et al. confirmed this in 1985, and a period of roughly 250 days was determined. They referred to this type of star, which they classified as a high-luminosity long-period Cepheid, as a Leavitt variable in homage to Henrietta Swan Leavitt, who first discovered the period–luminosity relations in Cepheids and pseudo-Cepheids back in 1907.

In 1989, van Genderen & Hadiyanto claimed that the variations were not of a Cepheid nature due to the highly unstable light curves, and that the star was an Alpha Cygni variable instead. This classification has been upheld by later studies. One of which, van Leeuwen et al. (1998), provided a period of 260 days (0.71 years) and stated that there may be another oscillation with a significantly longer period. Light curves provided by Kourniotis et al. (2022) show a pulsation period of 833 days (2.28 years).

Between December 2016 and August 2017, the effective temperature was observed to have risen from 6100±50 K to 6500±100 K, mirroring the strong pulsations.

The star is not known to exhibit fast yellow pulsating supergiant (FYPS) characteristics.

=== 2008 outburst ===
Kourniotis et al. discovered that the star underwent an outburst in late 2008. This was less energetic than the ones seen in Rho Cassiopeiae in 2000 and 2013, but nevertheless caused a 0.4-magnitude dip in brightness followed by a period of substantial brightening, and possibly resulted in mass ejection. Much like Rho Cassiopeiae's 2000 outburst, it may have been caused by the collapse of the deep photosphere. They conclude that the star is a post-red supergiant and a "modest" Rho Cassiopeiae analog.
