= Omicron Centauri =

Two stars in the constellation Centaurus

The Bayer designation Omicron Centauri (ο Cen / ο Centauri) is shared by two star systems, in the constellation Centaurus:

- ο^{1} Centauri
- ο^{2} Centauri

They are separated by 0.07° on the sky. They may be physically related.
