= Omicron2 Centauri =

Variable star in the constellation Centaurus

ο^{2} Centauri
- Location of ο^{2} Cen (circled)

Observation data Epoch J2000.0 Equinox ICRS
- Constellation: Centaurus
- Right ascension: 11^{h} 31^{m} 48.79955^{s}
- Declination: −59° 30′ 56.3296″
- Apparent magnitude (V): +5.14 (5.12 - 5.22)

Characteristics
- Evolutionary stage: Blue supergiant
- Spectral type: A2Iae
- U−B color index: −0.11
- B−V color index: +0.49
- Variable type: α Cyg

Astrometry
Radial velocity (R_{v})	−16.8 km/s
Proper motion (μ)	RA: −6.976 mas/yr Dec.: +1.118 mas/yr
Parallax (π)	0.4665±0.0713 mas
Distance	approx. 7,000 ly (approx. 2,100 pc)
Absolute magnitude (M_{V})	−7.50

Details
Mass	18 M_{☉}
Radius	131 R_{☉}
Luminosity	105,000 L_{☉}
Surface gravity (log g)	1.46 cgs
Temperature	9,080 K
Rotation	132 days
Rotational velocity (v sin i)	50 km/s

Other designations
- ο^{2} Cen, CD−58°4101, FK5 2920, GC 15820, HD 100262, HIP 56250, HR 4442, SAO 239146

Database references
SIMBAD	data

Omicron^{2} Centauri is a star in the southern constellation Centaurus. Its name is a Bayer designation that is Latinized from ο^{2} Centauri, and abbreviated Omicron^{2} Cen or ο^{2} Cen. This star is visible to the naked eye with a mean apparent visual magnitude of +5.12. Based on parallax measurements, it is located at a distance of approximately 7,000 light years from Earth.

ο^{2} Centauri is a white A-type blue supergiant. It is classified as an Alpha Cygni type variable star and its brightness varies from magnitude +5.12 to +5.22 with a period of 46.3 days. In 1996, Kaufer and colleagues calculated Omicron^{2} Centauri to be around 136,000 times as luminous, 18 times as massive and have 131 times the diameter of the Sun.

ο^{2} Cen forms a close naked eye pair with ο^{1} Cen, another 5th magnitude supergiant (possibly a yellow hypergiant). Both stars are located between Crux (the Southern Cross) and the brightest yellow hypergiant in the sky, V382 Carinae.
