= IRAS 18357−0604 =

Star in the constellation Scutum

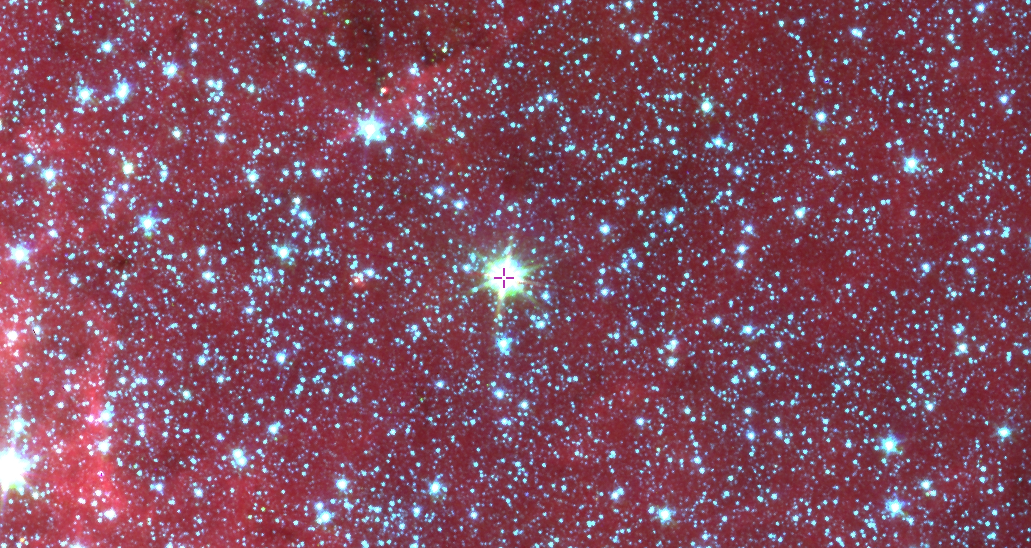
- The yellow hypergiant star IRAS 18357−0604, viewed by the IRAC HEALPix survey. Stephenson 2 DFK 1 is on the lower left. Credit: Université de Strasbourg/CNRS (2003)

Observation data Epoch J2000 Equinox ICRS
- Constellation: Scutum
- Right ascension: 18^{h} 38^{m} 23.405^{s}
- Declination: −06° 01′ 26.77″

Characteristics
- Evolutionary stage: Yellow hypergiant
- Spectral type: A2Ia+

Astrometry
Parallax (π)	0.4247±0.3526 mas
Distance	19,600 ly (6,000 pc)

Details
Radius	167 (Note: Applying the Stefan–Boltzmann law with a nominal solar effective temperature of 5,772 K: $$\sqrt{(5772/8913)^4 * 10^{5.2}} = 167.32\ R\odot$$) R_{☉}
Luminosity	158,500 L_{☉}
Temperature	8,913 K

Other designations
- 2MASS J18382341−0601269, TIC 7756628

Database references
SIMBAD	data

IRAS 18357−0604 is a yellow hypergiant (YHG) star located in the constellation of Scutum, estimated to be about 19,600 light years, or 6,000 parsecs, away. IRAS 18357−0604 is remarkably similar to IRC +10420, another yellow hypergiant in the constellation of Aquila.

== Position ==
A distance of 6,000 parsecs (inferred from the systemic velocity of the star) would place IRAS 18357−0604 within the red supergiant (RSG) "association" in the Scutum-Centaurus arm, which contains clusters such as RSGC1 and RSGC2. The luminosity derived from the distance is consistent with IRAS 18357−0604 being formed from the same star formation burst as that which created the red supergiants in the area. The star is also located about 14 arcminutes from RSGC2, so the possibility of it being a runaway from the cluster cannot be excluded, but replicating its properties in such a scenario would require an unexpectedly extreme mass-loss rate during its preceding red supergiant phase.

== Properties ==
IRAS 18357−0604 is likely to be a very luminous star, like all YHGs. Assuming a distance of 6,000 parsecs, the star would have a bolometric luminosity of about 160,000 L_{☉}. Based on its spectrum, the star likely has a temperature of about 9,000 K. Applying the Stefan-Boltzmann law to these parameters means that the star has a radius of about 167 R_{☉}.

== Evolutionary Status ==
In the RSG agglomerate of which IRAS 18357−0604 may be a part, RSGC1 and RSGC2 represent the youngest and oldest clusters in the area. This suggests that star formation in the area peaked over the last 10-20 million years, which means that evolved stars in the area have initial masses between 12 M_{☉} and 22 M_{☉}. If this age and mass range is applicable to the wider RSG association, the parameters of IRAS 18357−0604 are consistent with membership of the association. Theoretical models of rotating stars are able to reproduce IRAS 18357−0604's parameters assuming an initial mass of 18-20 M_{☉} and an age comparable to that of RSGC1 (~12 Myr). If IRAS 18357's initial mass is closer to 18 M_{☉}, it may be the progenitor of a core-collapse type IIb supernova, and it might explode in the relatively near future. Instead, if its initial mass is closer to 20 M_{☉}, it may evolve through an LBV stage and get slightly hotter before exploding in a type IIb supernova.
