= Lion Nebula =

The Lion Nebula is a common name for the following nebulae;

- Sh 2-132
- The Eskimo Nebula
