= HD 179821 =

Star in the constellation Aquila

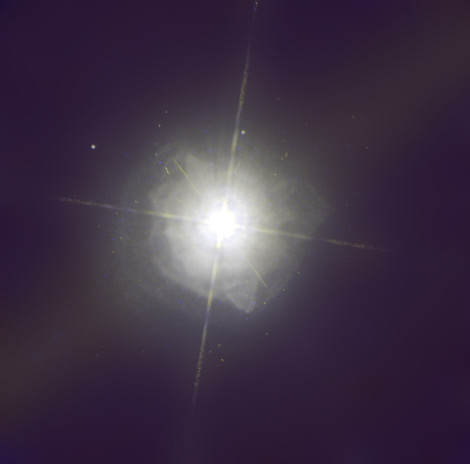
- HD 179821; Credit: Hubble Legacy Archive

Observation data Epoch J2000 Equinox J2000
- Constellation: Aquila
- Right ascension: 19^{h} 13^{m} 58.61^{s}
- Declination: +00° 07′ 31.9″
- Apparent magnitude (V): 8.19 (7.83 - 8.23)

Characteristics
- Evolutionary stage: YHG or post-AGB
- Spectral type: G4 0-Ia (G5Ia - K4I)
- Apparent magnitude (U): 10.81
- Apparent magnitude (B): 9.694
- Apparent magnitude (R): 8.2
- Apparent magnitude (J): 5.371
- Apparent magnitude (H): 4.998
- Apparent magnitude (K): 4.728
- B−V color index: +1.504
- Variable type: SRd

Astrometry
Radial velocity (R_{v})	+81.8±3.7 km/s
Proper motion (μ)	RA: −0.090 mas/yr Dec.: −3.494 mas/yr
Parallax (π)	0.1893±0.0206 mas
Distance	approx. 17,000 ly (approx. 5,300 pc)
Absolute magnitude (M_{V})	−8.9 or −5.7

Details

if a hypergiant
Mass	19 - 30 M_{☉}
Radius	400 - 450 R_{☉}
Luminosity	126,000 - 295,000 L_{☉}
Surface gravity (log g)	0.5 cgs
Temperature	4,898 - 6,761 K
Metallicity [Fe/H]	0.0 dex

if post-AGB
Mass	0.8 M_{☉}
Radius	147 (Note: Applying the Stefan-Boltzmann Law with a nominal solar effective temperature of 5,772 K: $$\sqrt{(5772/5660)^4 * 20,000} = 147.07\ R\odot$$) R_{☉}
Luminosity	20,000+12,000 −7,400 L_{☉}
Surface gravity (log g)	0.5 cgs
Temperature	5,660 K
Metallicity [Fe/H]	0.0 dex

Other designations
- HD 179821, V1427 Aql, AFGL 2343, BD−00°3679, HIP 94496, SAO 124414, IRAS 19114+0002, 2MASS J19135861+0007319

Database references
SIMBAD	data

HD 179821 or V1427 Aquilae is either a post-red supergiant yellow hypergiant or a post-AGB yellow supergiant star in the constellation of Aquila, surrounded by a detached dust shell. It is a semi-regular variable nearing the end of its life.

== Discovery ==
HD 179821 was first catalogued as an unremarkable 8th magnitude star at the start of the 20th century. It was later listed as a spectral standard G4 0-Ia, indicating a highly luminous star type now known as a hypergiant.

It was first considered notable for its infrared excess and double-peaked spectral energy distribution in the infrared. These were considered to be indicators of surrounding dust and HD 179821 was identified as a possible protoplanetary nebula. Variability was also detected.

High resolution spectroscopic studies and modern space-based observations have revealed an unusual chemical makeup and a hollow spherical dust shell, but haven't fully resolved whether HD 179821 is a highly luminous yellow hypergiant or a dimmer, lower-mass post-AGB star.

== Observations ==
HD 179821 has a cold detached dust shell that has been studied with the help of the Hubble Space Telescope. The shell is approximately circular in shape, has an inner diameter of ~3".3 corresponding to 20,000 AU at 6,000 pc, and an outer diameter of 5".7 or more, with the star 0".35 from the centre of the shell. The current mass loss is low, but during the formation of the shell it is estimated to have been 4×10^{−4} M_{☉}/yr, an exceptionally high rate being comparable to that of the archetypical OH/IR red supergiant, VY Canis Majoris. Like its constellation neighbor and also hypergiant star IRC +10420, it is surrounded by an extended reflection nebula. Discovered at near-IR wavelength, this indicates a massive star and, as with the reflection nebula around IRC +10420, it may be masking a star hotter than the given G5 spectral type.

It is that which contributes to a double-peaked spectral energy distribution. It is estimated the star has lost about 10% of its initial mass after being a red supergiant star just 1,600 years ago, and is a likely supernova candidate.

The distance was once estimated to be around 6,000 parsecs. It has a high luminosity of between 1.26×10^{5} and 2.95×10^{5} L_{☉} and a radius of between 400 and 450 R_{☉}. It has a high radial velocity of +100 km/s. According to the studies of Jura et al (2001), the star may explode as a supernova in the next 100,000 years.

=== Variability ===
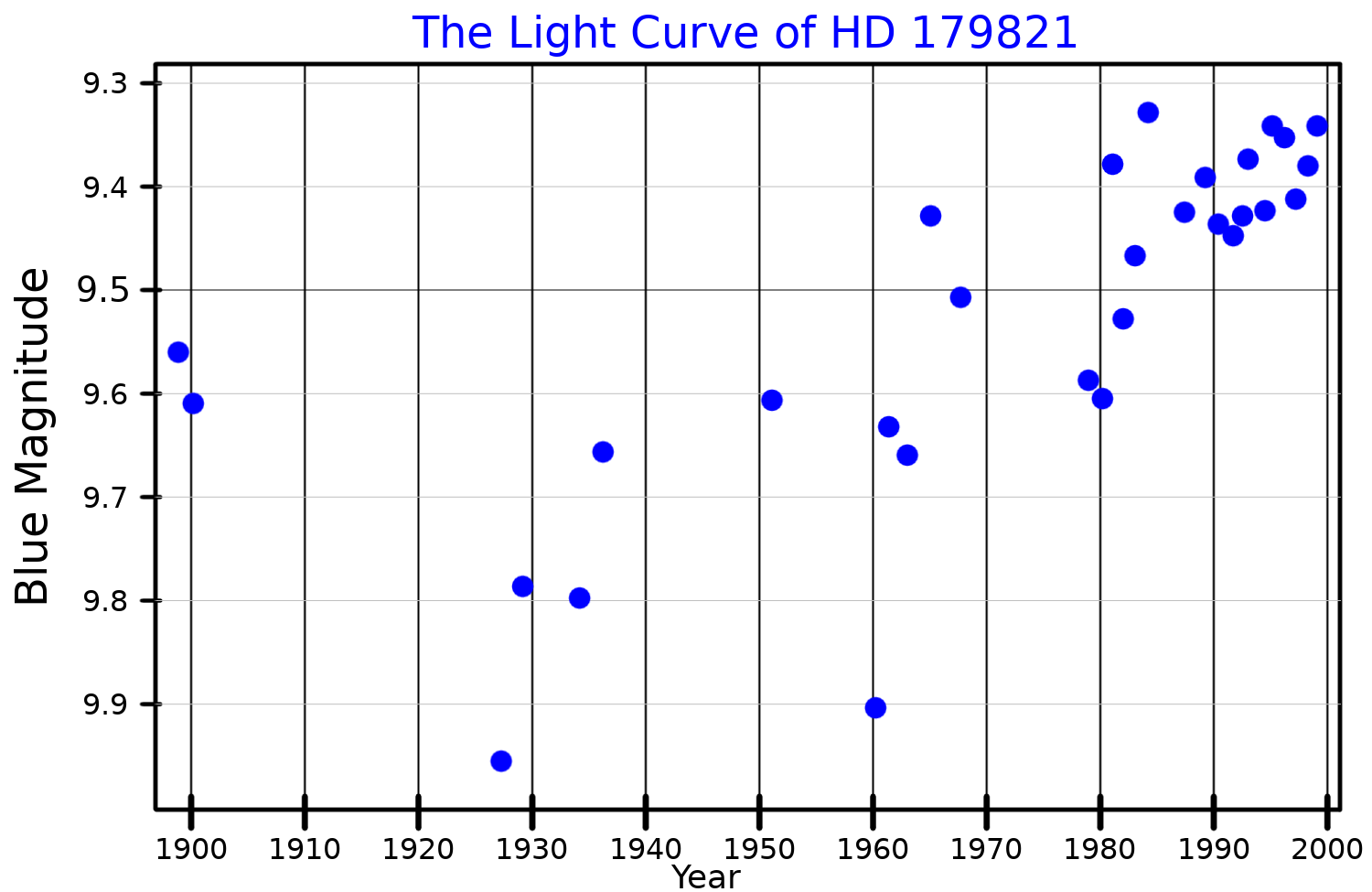
The blue band light curve of HD 179821, adapted from Arkhipova et al. (2001)

HD 179821 is a semiregular variable star with the variable star designation V1427 Aquilae. Between 1899 and 1989, its photographic apparent magnitude varied erratically between about magnitudes 9 and 10, although coverage is not complete and some larger variations may have been missed. It then varied by no more than 0.1 magnitudes until 2009, at a visual magnitude around 8.1.

The colour of the star changed noticeably so that the variability at different wavelengths is not consistent. In general, the star became bluer from 1899 until 1990, and then redder again. The colour changes most likely reflect changes in the effective temperature, and probably underlying evolutionary trends with the star performing a blue loop between temperatures of 4,000 K and 8,000 K. Pulsations for much of this time occurred with an approximate period of 100 to 150 days, although this increased to 250 days between 2010 and 2017, which is expected for stars which are decreasing in temperature. At its coolest, the spectral type has been recorded as K4, while near its hottest in 2007 it was classified as F7.

=== Chemical composition ===
The chemical composition of this star differs from that of other yellow supergiant stars. The star is moderately metal-deficient and the main elements present in the star (apart from hydrogen and helium) are oxygen, carbon and nitrogen. Molecules such as hydrogen isocyanide, sulfur monoxide and HCO^{+} have been detected in the circumstellar envelope of the star. These molecules may result from an active photochemistry, generated by UV photons emitted by the central star as it warms up, or can be produced in shocks.

== Controversy ==
While most authors consider HD 179821 to be a warm hypergiant star, others think it is actually a protoplanetary nebula or a smaller post-AGB star at a distance of 1 kiloparsec (3,200 light years). In that case the star's luminosity and radius would be much lower, around 16,000 times that of the Sun and 60 to 80 R_{☉}, and its initial mass would be equal to the current mass of the Sun.

This discrepancy arises because its distance was too great to be measured by parallax before the Gaia mission and it has some properties of both a yellow hypergiant and a protoplanetary nebula/Post-AGB star. Gaia Data Release 3 gives a parallax of 0.19 mas implying a distance around 5,300 pc.

== See also ==
- List of supernova candidates

== Sources ==
- Juraj Zverko; Jozef Ziznovsky; Saul J. Adelman; Werner W. Weiss (25 April 2005). The A-Star Puzzle (IAU S224). Cambridge University Press. pp. 390–. ISBN 978-0-521-85018-6.
- Oudmaijer, R. D.; Davies, B.; De Wit, W.-J.; Patel, M. (2009). "Post-Red Supergiants". In Donald D. Luttermoser; Beverly J. Smith; Robert E. Stencil (eds.). Biggest, Baddest, Coolest Stars. Astronomical Society of the Pacific Conference Series. Vol. 412. p. 17. arXiv:0801.2315. Bibcode:2009ASPC..412...17O.
