= R Puppis =

Variable star in the constellation Puppis

- Location of R Puppis (circled)

Observation data Epoch J2000 Equinox J2000
- Constellation: Puppis
- Right ascension: 07^{h} 40^{m} 52.597^{s}
- Declination: −31° 39′ 40.20″
- Apparent magnitude (V): 6.50 - 6.71

Characteristics
- Spectral type: G2 0-Ia
- U−B color index: +0.85
- B−V color index: +1.18
- Variable type: SRd

Astrometry
Radial velocity (R_{v})	+68.22 km/s
Proper motion (μ)	RA: −2.251 mas/yr Dec.: +3.222 mas/yr
Parallax (π)	0.2440±0.0180 mas
Distance	13,400 ± 1,000 ly (4,100 ± 300 pc)
Absolute magnitude (M_{V})	−7.8

Details
Mass	14.3 M_{☉}
Radius	245±22 R_{☉}
Luminosity	95,500+22,000 −20,000 L_{☉}
Surface gravity (log g)	0.30 cgs
Temperature	4,100±68 K
Metallicity [Fe/H]	−0.25 dex

Other designations
- CD−31°4910, GSC 07106-03582, HIP 37415, HR 2974, HD 62058

Database references
SIMBAD	data

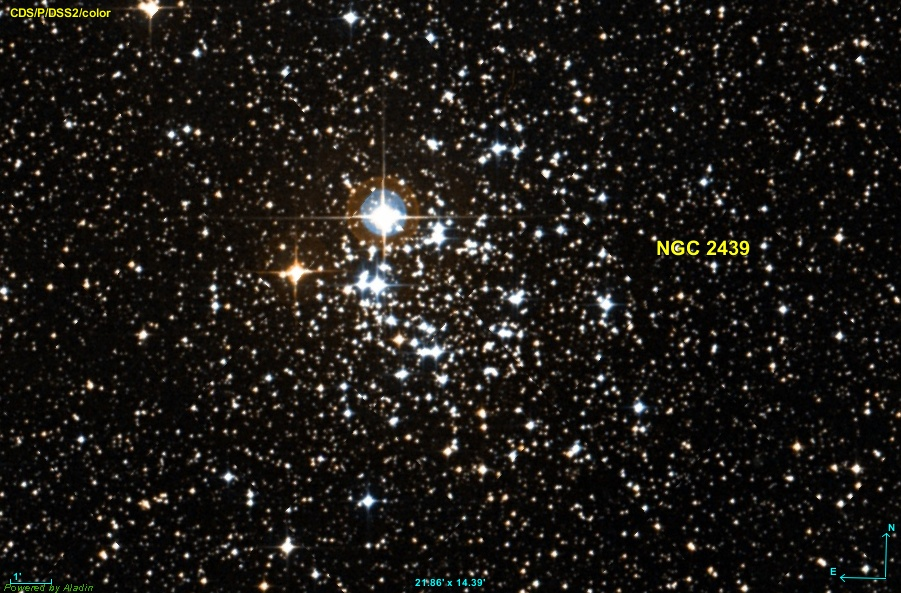
NGC 2439, with R Puppis the brightest star

R Puppis is a variable star in the constellation Puppis. It is a rare yellow hypergiant and a candidate member of the open cluster NGC 2439. It is also an MK spectral standard for the class G2 0-Ia.

== Variability ==
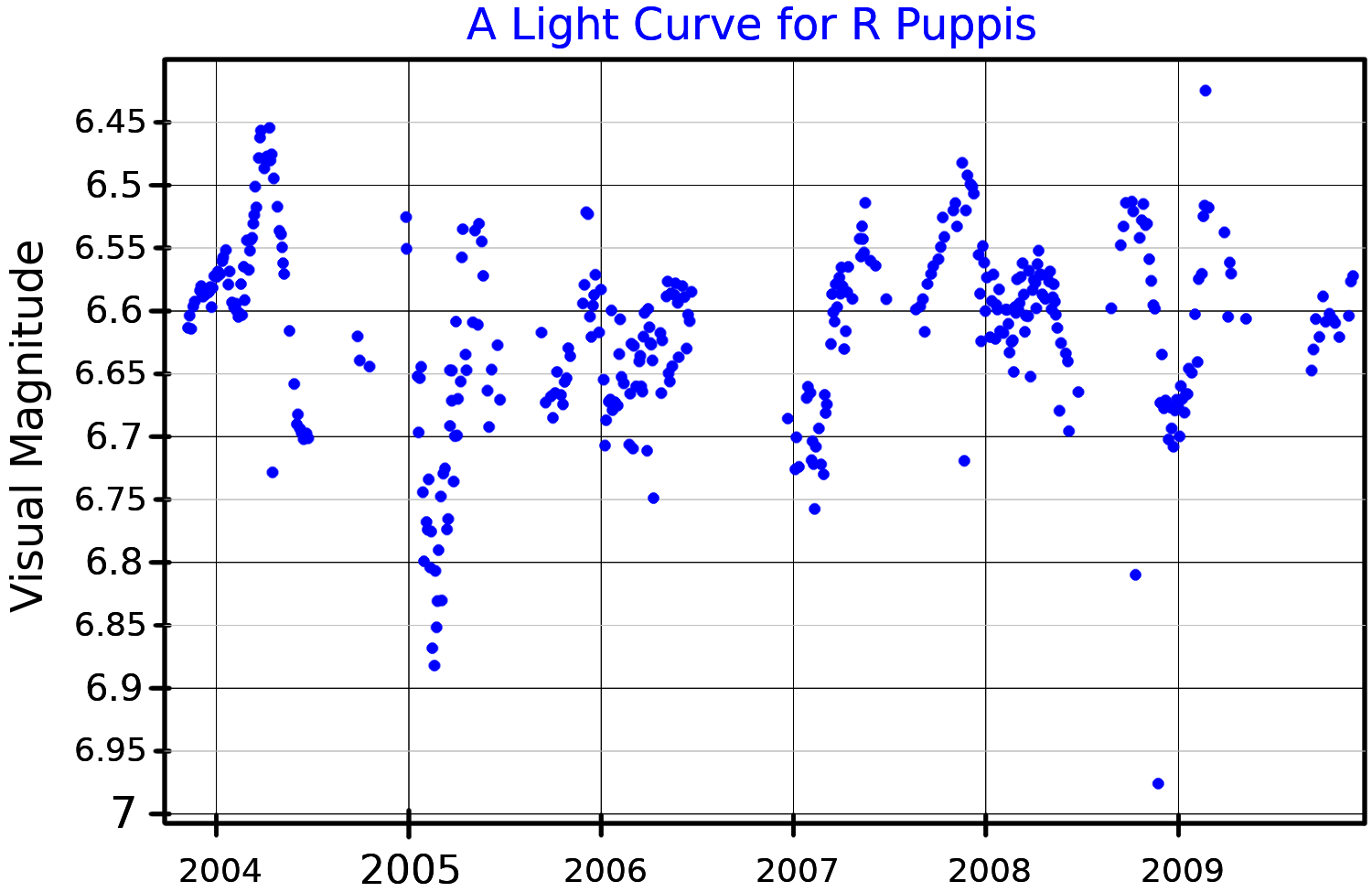
A visual band light curve for R Puppis, plotted from ASAS data

R Puppis was identified as a variable star in 1879, and described as having a range of over a magnitude. Numerous observations over the following 100 years failed to confirm the variations, until the 1970s when clear brightness changes were observed. These were confirmed by later observations, but with a total visual amplitude of only about 0.2 magnitudes.

Variable stars such as R Puppis have been described as pseudo-Cepheids, because they lie above the high-luminosity portion of the instability strip and their variations are similar to those of Cepheids although less regular. R Puppis is formally classified as a semiregular variable of type SRd, meaning F, G, or K giants or supergiants.
