= Roberta M. Humphreys =

American stellar astrophyscist

- Born: 1944 (age 81–82); Indiana

Academic background
- Education: AB Astronomy; MS Astronomy; Ph.D. Astronomy
- Alma mater: Indiana University; University of Michigan

Roberta M. Humphreys is an American observational stellar astrophysicist. She is professor emerita at the University of Minnesota. Her work has included galactic structure, observational stellar evolution, stellar populations, and large databases. She is best known for her research on massive stars in the Milky Way and in nearby resolved galaxies.

She is an Honorary Fellow of the Royal Astronomical Society, a recipient of the Humboldt Senior Scientist Award, and a Fellow of the American Association for the Advancement of Science. In 2000, Asteroid 10172 was named Humphreys by her former student Jeffrey Larsen.

== Early life and education ==
Humphreys was born and raised in Indiana. She received an AB in Astronomy from Indiana University in 1965. She then went to University of Michigan where she received an MS in Astronomy in 1967 and a Ph.D. in Astronomy in 1969. Subsequently, she completed her post-doctoral training at Vanderbilt University and at the Steward Observatory, University of Arizona with Bart Bok.

== Career ==
Humphreys joined University of Minnesota in 1972 as an assistant professor, becoming associate professor in 1976 and full professor in 1983. In 2001, she was named a distinguished professor in the College of Science and Engineering. From 2002 to 2007, she served as the associate dean for academic affairs of the College of Science and Engineering at University of Minnesota.

In 2017, Humphreys became professor emerita at University of Minnesota.

=== Research and work ===
In 1979, Roberta Humphreys and Kris Davidson published a comparison of the luminous (massive) star populations in our region of the Galaxy and in the Large Magellanic Cloud (LMC) that revealed comparable populations of massive stars in these two galaxies. The most important result was their recognition of an empirical upper luminosity boundary or upper limit in the luminosity vs temperature diagrams, i.e. the Hertzsprung-Russell (HR) Diagram. This empirical boundary, often referred to in the astronomical literature as the Humphreys-Davidson Limit, was not predicted by theory or the stellar structure models and evolutionary tracks. The lack of evolved stars above a certain luminosity implies an upper limit to the masses of stars, at about 50 - 60 times the mass of the Sun, that can evolve to become red supergiants thus altering the previously expected evolution of the most massive stars across the HR Diagram.

They suggested that the most massive hot stars could not evolve to cooler temperatures because of their instabilities resulting in high mass loss. This mass loss could be unsteady and much greater at times resulting in high mass loss events.

Her later research has been focused on the final stages of massive stars evolution often dominated by high mass loss events as observed in eta Carinae, and the warm and cool hypergiants such as VY CMa and IRC +10420.

She also led the Automated Plate Scanner research group for over twenty years. They produced an on-line searchable catalog of the digitized scans of the famous Palomar Observatory Sky Survey, and were the first group to use neural networks to separate the images of stars and galaxies. The on-line catalog contains fundamental data and image parameters for over 90 million stars and galaxies.

== Awards and honors ==
- 1976 - Alfred P. Sloan Foundation Fellow
- 1980 - Elected Fellow of the American Association for the Advancement of Science
- 1985 - George W. Taylor Award for distinguished research, University of Minnesota
- 1987 - Alexander von Humboldt Distinguished Senior Scientist Award, Federal Republic of Germany
- 2008 - Mullen-Spector-Truax Women's Leadership Award, University of Minnesota
- 2014 - Honorary Fellow of the Royal Astronomical Society
- 2021 - Fellow of the American Astronomical Society
- 2024 - Herschel Medal of the Royal Astronomical Society

== Publications ==
=== Books ===
- Eta Carinae at the Millenium (1999)
- The Fate of the Most Massive Stars (2005)
- Eta Carinae and the Supernova Impostors (2012)
- Galaxies - Special Issue: Luminous Stars in Nearby Galaxies (2019)

=== Selected papers ===
- Studies of luminous stars in nearby galaxies. I. Supergiants and O stars in the Milky Way. The Astrophysical Journal (1978) 89
- Studies of luminous stars in nearby galaxies. III. Comments on the evolution of the most massive stars in the Milky Way and the Large Magellanic Cloud. (with K. Davidson) The Astrophysical Journal (1979)
- On the stellar content and structure of the spiral galaxy M33. (with A. Sandage) The Astrophysical Journal Suppl. (1980)
- The Luminous Blue Variables: Astrophysical Geysers. (with K. Davidson) Publ of the Astronomical Society of the Pacific (1994)
- Eta Carinae and Its Environment. (with K. Davidson) Annual Review of Astronomy and Astrophysics (1997)
- HST and Infrared Images of the Circumstellar Environment of the Cool Hypergiant IRC + 10420 (with N. Smith, K Davidson ...) The Astronomical Journal (1997)
- The Asymmetric Nebula Surrounding the Extreme Red Supergiant VY Canis Majoris (with K. Davidson, N. Smith ...) The Astronomical Journal (2001)
- Crossing the Yellow Void: Spatially Resolved Spectroscopy of the Post-Red Supergiant IRC +10420 and Its Circumstellar Ejecta (with K. Davidson, N. Smith) The Astronomical Journal (2002)
- High-Resolution, Long-Slit Spectroscopy of VY Canis Majoris: The Evidence for Localized High Mass Loss Events (with K, Davidson, G. Wallerstein...) The Astronomical Journal (2005)
- The Three-Dimensional Morphology of VY Canis Majoris. I. The Kinematics of the Ejecta (with L. A. Helton, T. J. Jones) The Astronomical Journal (2007)
- The Early Spectra of Eta Carinae 1892 to 1941 and the Onset of its High Excitation Emission Spectrum (with K. Davidson, M. Koppelman) The Astronomical Journal (2008)
- The Morphology of IRC+10420's Circumstellar Ejecta. (with C. Tiffany, T.J. Jones, K. Davidson) The Astronomical Journal (2010)
- Recovery from Giant Eruptions in Very Massive Stars, (with A. Kashi, K. Davidson) The Astrophysical Journal (2016)
- Luminous and Variable Stars in M31 and M33. V. The Upper HR Diagram, The Astrophysical Journal (2017)
