= IRAS 17163−3907 =

Yellow hypergiant in the constellation Scorpius

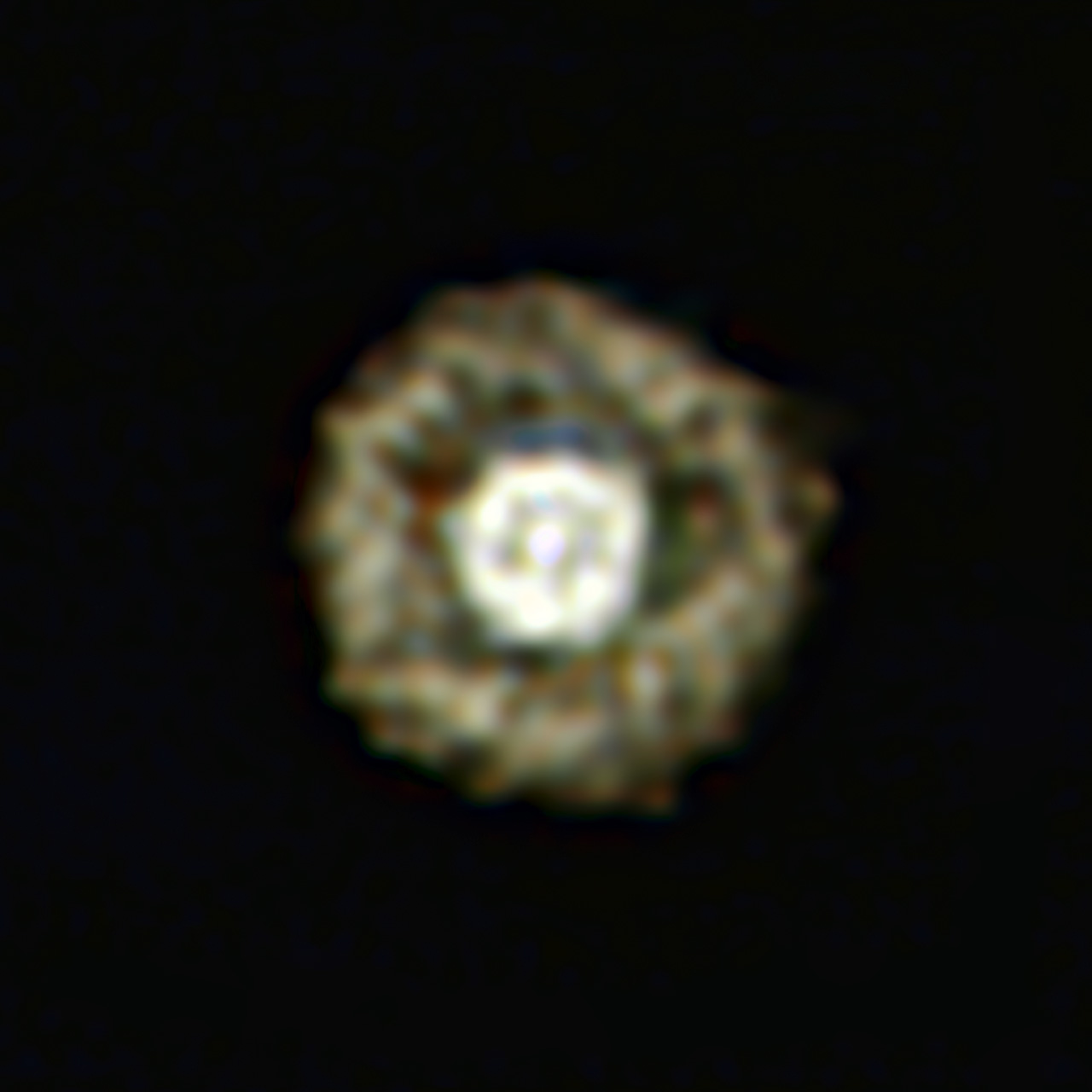
- Nebula around the yellow hypergiant star IRAS 17163−3907, taken by the Very Large Telescope. Credit: ESO/E. Lagadec

Observation data Epoch J2000 Equinox ICRS
- Constellation: Scorpius
- Right ascension: 17^{h} 19^{m} 49.330^{s}
- Declination: −39° 10′ 37.94″
- Apparent magnitude (V): 12.45

Characteristics
- Evolutionary stage: yellow hypergiant
- Spectral type: A3-A6Ia
- Apparent magnitude (J): 4.635
- Apparent magnitude (H): 3.021
- Apparent magnitude (K): 2.407
- J−H color index: 1.614
- J−K color index: 2.228

Astrometry
Radial velocity (R_{v})	−41.83 km/s
Proper motion (μ)	RA: −1.111 mas/yr Dec.: −2.299 mas/yr
Parallax (π)	0.8309±0.1674 mas
Distance	1,200+400 −200 pc
Absolute magnitude (M_{V})	~−10

Details
Mass	~22 M_{☉}
Radius	325 R_{☉}
Luminosity	500,000 L_{☉}
Surface gravity (log g)	~0.9 cgs
Temperature	8,300 – 8,500 K

Other designations
- Fried Egg Nebula, IRAS 17163−3907, Hen 3-1379, NSV 21444, 2MASS J17194933−3910374, UCAC2 15112979, DENIS J171949.3−391037, GSC 07870−01348, GSC2 S2300121509, MSX6C G348.5107−01.1199

Database references
SIMBAD	data

IRAS 17163−3907, also known as Hen 3-1379, is a yellow hypergiant star located 13,000 light years from Earth in the constellation of Scorpius. The star is embedded in thick shells of expelled gases and dust, and owing to its appearance has been nicknamed by astronomers the "Fried Egg Nebula". Yellow hypergiants are in an extremely active phase of their evolution.

== Discovery ==
The star was discovered and catalogued as emission line star Hen 3–1379 in 1976, and classified as a proto-planetary nebula in 2003 after the 2.2 micron infrared sky survey. In 1989, it was analysed as a post-AGB star and assumed to have a luminosity of 9,600 L_{☉} and a distance around 1,000 pc.

Although IRAS 17163-3907 is one of the brightest mid-IR sources in the sky, very few observations were made until 2011 when it was proposed to be at a much larger distance and hence to be a highly luminous object, probably a yellow hypergiant.

== Description ==
The picture of the star causing it to be dubbed the Fried Egg Nebula was taken in the mid infrared spectrum by the VISIR instrument in the Very Large Telescope in the Atacama Desert in northern Chile. The filters passed light of frequencies 12,810 nm (mapped to red in the image), 11,850 nm (mapped to green), and 8,590 nm (mapped to blue). The star is about 500,000 times the luminosity of the Sun. The photograph pictured is one of the best ever taken of a yellow hypergiant. The star is eventually expected to end its life in a supernova.

== Shells ==
The star is characterized by two visible dusty shells. The inner shell is 4800 AU in diameter and the outer shell is 12,000 AU wide. The source of materials for the shells is material ejected from the star during ejection events common in hypergiants. The time period between expulsion of materials causing the first and the second outer shells is estimated at 435 years and the total mass in the ejecta is around 4 M_{☉}, of which about 1% is dust. At its most active the star ejects materials equal to the mass of the Sun every few hundred years. The shells are also discovered to be rich in silicates and hence oxygen. The star may contain more outer shells, but they were not detected by the VISIR instrument, as the field of view of the instrument is insufficient. Estimates of the outer shell are that it contains 0.17 solar masses of dust and was produced in an outburst 17,000 years ago that expelled 6-7 solar masses of gas.

The properties of these shells are considered similar to those surrounding IRC+10420 (also an evolved massive star suffering heavy mass loss) as well as, for the outer shell, those around luminous blue variables, suggesting both that IRAS 17163−3907 is in a pre-LBV stage and that the ring nebulae that often surround those types of stars may originate with mass loss during the red supergiant stage.
