= V509 Cassiopeiae =

Star in the constellation Cassiopeia

- Location of V509 Cassiopeiae (circled in red)

Observation data Epoch J2000.0 Equinox ICRS
- Constellation: Cassiopeia
- Right ascension: 23^{h} 00^{m} 05.101221^{s}
- Declination: +56° 56′ 43.3509″
- Apparent magnitude (V): +4.6 - +6.1

Characteristics
- Spectral type: G4 0 (G0 - A6Ia^{+})
- U−B color index: +1.33
- B−V color index: +1.0 - +1.7
- Variable type: SRd

Astrometry
Radial velocity (R_{v})	−50.20 km/s
Proper motion (μ)	RA: −3.013 mas/yr Dec.: −2.213 mas/yr
Parallax (π)	0.2507±0.0633 mas
Distance	11,000±400 ly (3,368±127 pc)
Absolute magnitude (M_{V})	−8.6 (variable)

Details
Mass	10.8 or 19.6 M_{☉}
Radius	433±17 R_{☉}
Luminosity	680,000+220,000 −210,000 L_{☉}
Temperature	7,900 K
Metallicity [Fe/H]	0.0 dex

Other designations
- HR 8752, HD 217476, FK5 3839, HIP 113561, SAO 35039, AAVSO 2255+56

Database references
SIMBAD	data

V509 Cassiopeiae (V509 Cas or HR 8752) is one of two yellow hypergiant stars found in the constellation Cassiopeia, which also contains Rho Cassiopeiae.

HR 8752 is around 11,000 light-years from Earth. It has an apparent magnitude that has varied from below +6 in historical times to a peak of +4.6 and now around +5.3 and is classified as a semiregular variable star of type SRd. It is undergoing strong mass loss as part of its rapid evolution and has recently passed partway through the yellow evolutionary void by ejecting around a solar mass of material in 20 years.

A hot main sequence companion (B1V) was described in 1978 on the basis of a colour excess in the ultraviolet.

== Observations ==
=== Brightness ===
HR 8752 is a naked eye star but it has no Bayer or Flamsteed designation, and is not recorded in other catalogues before the 19th century. When first recorded in the Radcliffe Observatory catalogue in 1840 it was 6th magnitude, and it is assumed it had been 6th magnitude or fainter before then. The star is slightly variable on a timescale of around a year, but the average brightness increased steadily, reaching magnitude 5.0 in the 1950s.

The brightness climbed to magnitude 4.75 by 1973, but the exact onset of this event was not well observed. Since then the star has been studied much more closely. It peaked at magnitude 4.6 in 1976, then dropped quickly to magnitude 4.9 by 1979, then oscillated between magnitudes 4.75 and 4.85 for the next decade. Since then the brightness has generally decreased, with somewhat irregular variations of less than a tenth of a magnitude, to magnitude 5.3 in 2000. As of 2025, it has been stable at magnitude 5.3 for at least eight years.

There are possible historical records of new stars in Cassiopeia that could correspond to earlier outbursts of HR 8752, but the association is highly speculative.

=== Spectrum ===
Spectral types and colour comparisons for HR 8752 have been made regularly for over a century. The star was recognised as somewhat unusual and probably highly luminous, but not variable. It was actually proposed as a spectral standard for type G0Ia.

The colour of the star as measured by the difference between blue and visual magnitudes (B−V) may have decreased slightly from about 1.2 in 1900 to 0.8 in the 1960s. Measurements in different eras are not always calibrated to the same spectral bands, and the values have to be de-reddened to account for interstellar extinction, but the small change corresponds to records of the spectrum and are considered to be real. The colour then reddened dramatically to a B−V value of as much as 1.6 magnitudes in 1973, dropped rapidly to 0.02 by 2000, and has remained about constant since then. The detailed observations available since 1960 also show rapid colour variations of about 0.2 magnitudes on scales of 1–5 years super-imposed on the overall trends.

The spectral type over the same period has changed from a G0 hypergiant at the start of the 20th century, to early K in 1973, then rapidly back to G0 by 1977, continuing to reach A6 Ia^{+} in 2011. These spectral types are compatible with the observed colour changes, indicating changes in the temperature of the star or its dense winds. The spectrum contains nitrogen and helium emission lines with unusual P Cygni profiles, including "inverse P Cygni" and double-peaked line profiles. Forbidden N_{II} lines and a triple-peaked H_{α} line have strengthened dramatically since 1993, and the profiles have also changed indicating developments in circumstellar material probably ejected from the star.

== Properties ==
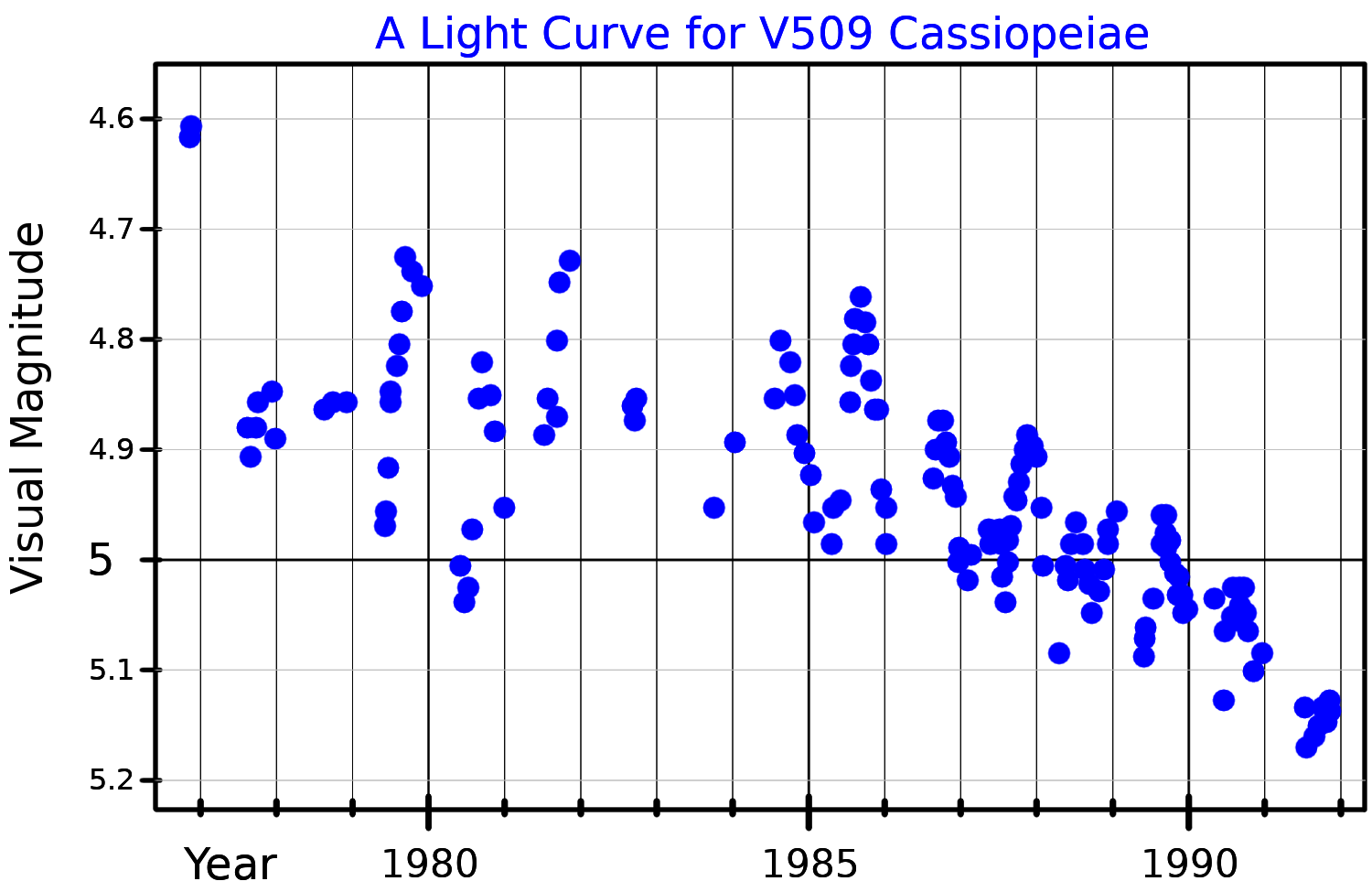
The visual band light curve for V509 Cassiopeiae, adapted from Percy and Zsoldos (1992)

It appears that HR 8752 is not just varying in brightness and fluctuating in temperature and size like most unstable stars, but is actually undergoing a secular evolutionary shift from cooler to hotter temperatures.

The temperature can be estimated with some accuracy from the spectral and colour observations. The calculated effective temperature increased from 4,500K in 1900 to 5,000K in 1960. At that stage the luminosity was around 243,000 L_{☉} and the radius 680 R_{☉}.

The star then varied erratically until 1973 when it rapidly expanded and cooled. A detailed spectral analysis in 1977 reported a temperature low of 4,000K, with a peak luminosity in 1976 of 400,000 L_{☉} with a radius of over 900 R_{☉}. The surface gravity at this time was calculated to be log(g) = -2, indicating that the visible surface was effectively detached from the star. The star then rapidly returned to around its previous temperature of 5,000K, a luminosity of 316,000 L_{☉}, and radius of 776 R_{☉}.

Starting in 1985, HR 8752 began a startling change, increasing in temperature to around 8,000K and decreasing in size to 400 R_{☉} by 2000, with a luminosity of 213,000 L_{☉}. Since then the physical parameters have been more stable although the stellar wind continues to change. The surface gravity has returned to a more normal value for a luminous supergiant near log(g) = 1.0. This change means that in a few decades the star has passed through a region of instability on the H–R diagram where no stars are observed, an evolutionary change that has not been observed in any other star.

As of 2015 – 2022, the star has remained stable with an effective temperature of 7,900 K. In 1998, the angular diameter was measured at 1.245±0.032 milliarcseconds, translating to a physical radius of 449±20 R_{☉} at its estimated distance. More recent observations with the CHARA array in 2023 found a slightly lower angular diameter of 1.195±0.007 mas, yielding a radius of 433±17 R_{☉}.

Elemental abundances derived from the spectrum indicate approximately solar metallicity, although some elements are enhanced due to the evolutionary state of HR 8752.

== Evolutionary state ==
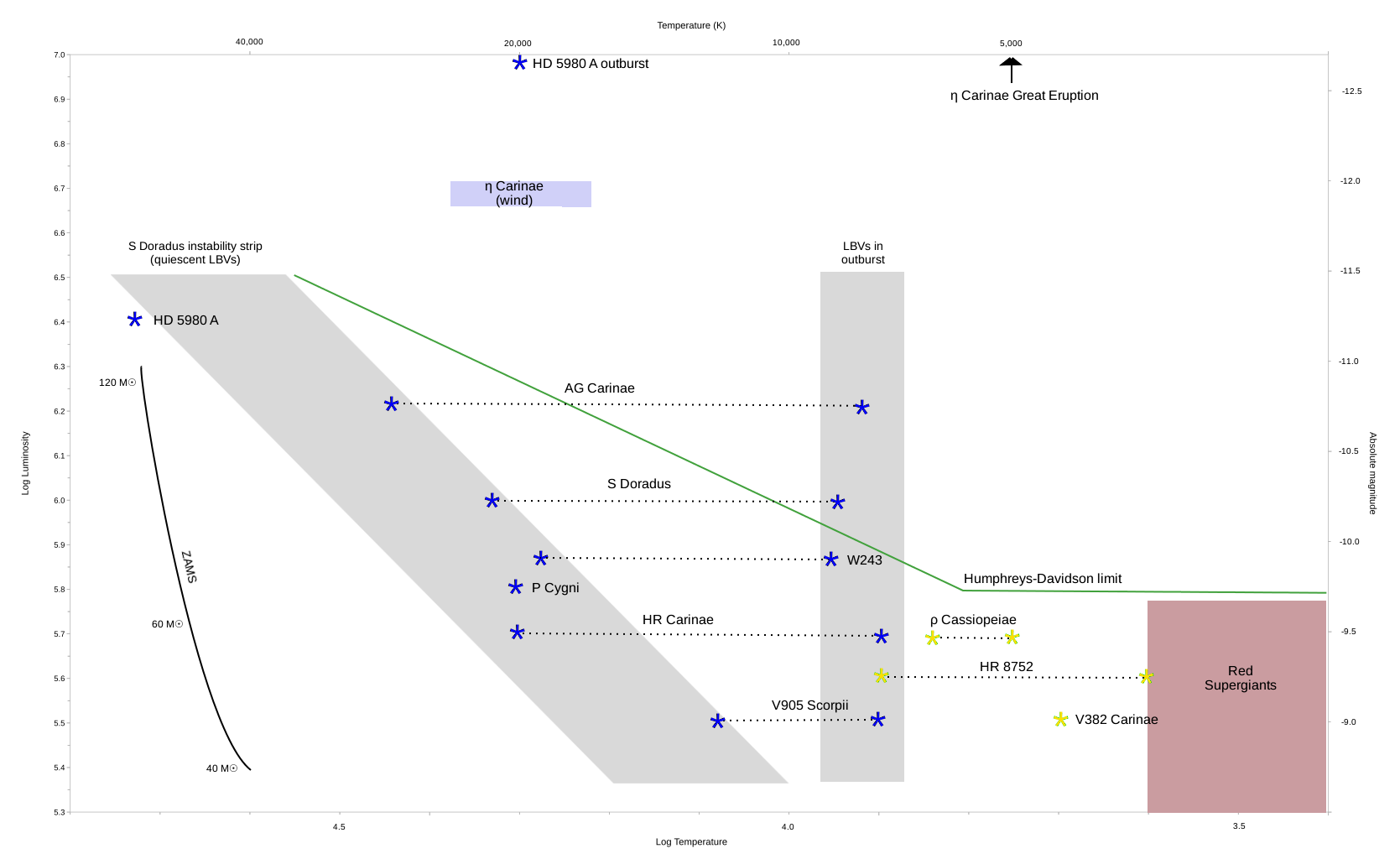
HR 8752 in comparison to other yellow hypergiants and luminous blue variables

Prior to 1973, HR 8752 was a cool yellow hypergiant with an early G spectral type. Following a dramatic shedding of its outer layers, it has now jumped to mid-A hypergiant and is not expected to return to its cool state. Models of a 25-40 M_{☉} main sequence star show it crossing the "yellow evolutionary void" instability region first towards cooler temperatures, then later back towards hotter temperatures. The yellow evolutionary void is named because very few stars are found in that part of the H–R diagram. This is likely to be because the evolution of stars with such parameters is extremely rapid, perhaps even almost instant in astronomical terms.

The first crossing of the yellow evolutionary void is very rapid but the star does not experience major instability. The second crossing, returning to hotter temperatures after a time as a yellow hypergiant, involves crossing a region, or possibly two regions, where the star experiences major instability, expected to show as episodes of strong mass loss. HR 8752 has crossed the first of the two major zones of instability and is expected to migrate to even hotter temperatures over a timescale on the order of a thousand years. Based on its current observed state, HR 8752 is estimated to now have 11 M_{☉} left from an initial 25 M_{☉} and is likely to become a relatively low-luminosity luminous blue variable before evolving further into a Wolf–Rayet star.

The ultimate fate of all massive stars is a core collapse and some sort of supernova explosion. Below about 20 M_{☉} this is expected to occur as a type II supernova from a red supergiant progenitor. More massive stars evolve into Wolf–Rayet stars before exploding as a type Ib or Ic supernova. For some intermediate range of masses, stars are thought to undergo core collapse at the yellow hypergiant or LBV stage of their lives, resulting in a type IIb or perhaps IIn supernova. HR 8752 may be such a star, and may never make it beyond its current evolutionary state before exploding.

== Possible binary ==
HR 8752 may have a companion. Measurements of the ultraviolet spectral distribution show an excess that corresponds to the output of a B1 main-sequence star. The absolute magnitude was estimated at -4.5, approximately 40 times fainter than the primary at visual wavelengths. Although the stars must be fairly close (< 1400AU), no radial velocity variations have been detected in the spectral lines of the primary, and no lines are observed which can be attributed directly to the secondary. The observed spectrum may be mostly from a shell surrounding both stars. It has been suggested that some variations in spectral line profiles are caused by variations in colliding winds or disturbances of previously ejected material, caused during a periastron passage of the companion.
