= HD 33579 =

Star in the constellation Dorado

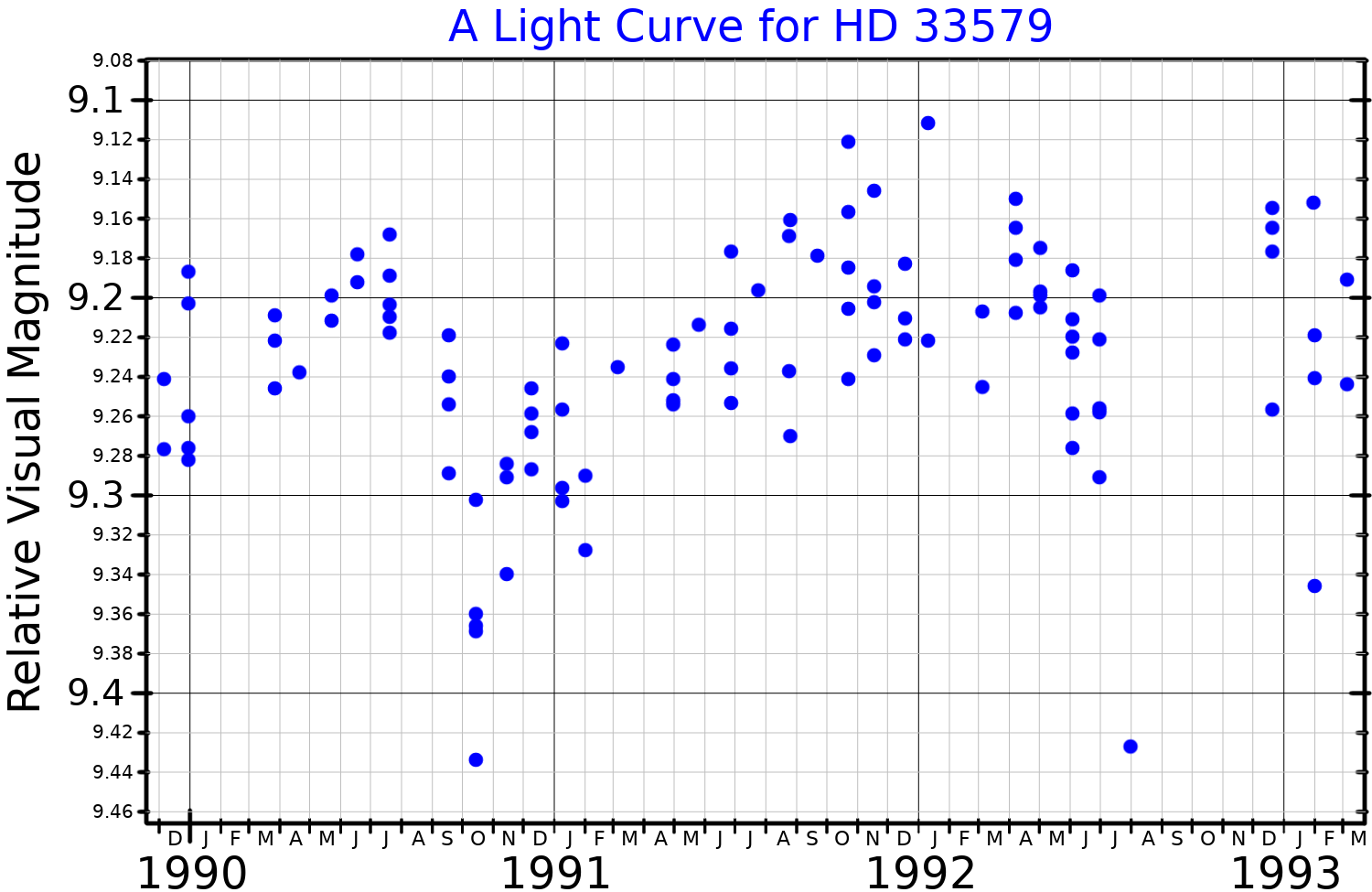
- A light curve for HD 33579, plotted from Hipparcos data

Observation data Epoch J2000.0 Equinox ICRS
- Constellation: Dorado
- Right ascension: 05^{h} 05^{m} 55.51147^{s}
- Declination: −67° 53′ 10.9330″
- Apparent magnitude (V): 8.99 - 9.22

Characteristics
- Spectral type: A3Ia^{+}
- U−B color index: −0.29
- B−V color index: +0.14
- Variable type: α Cygni

Astrometry
Radial velocity (R_{v})	255.959 km/s
Proper motion (μ)	RA: +1.810 mas/yr Dec.: +0.146 mas/yr
Parallax (π)	0.0178±0.0137 mas
Distance	148,700 ly (45,600 pc)
Absolute magnitude (M_{V})	−9.57

Details
Mass	20–30 M_{☉}
Radius	419 (Note: Applying the Stefan–Boltzmann law with a nominal solar effective temperature of 5,772 K: $$\sqrt{\biggl(\frac{5,772}{7,763}\biggr)^4 \cdot 10^{5.76}} = 419.37\ R_\odot$$.) 471 (Note: Applying the Stefan–Boltzmann law with a nominal solar effective temperature of 5,772 K: $$\sqrt{\biggl(\frac{5,772}{7,145}\biggr)^4 \cdot 10^{5.716}} = 470.6\ R_\odot$$.) R_{☉}
Luminosity	575,400 L_{☉}
Surface gravity (log g)	0.82±0.21 cgs
Temperature	7,763 K
Metallicity [Fe/H]	−0.38±0.14 dex

Other designations
- HD 33579, CD−68 258, HIP 23718, R76, SK −67 44, AAVSO 0506-68

Database references
SIMBAD	data

HD 33579 is a white/yellow hypergiant and one of the brightest stars in the Large Magellanic Cloud (LMC). It is a suspected variable star.

HD 33579 lies in a part of the Hertzsprung–Russell diagram referred to as the Yellow Evolutionary Void because stars with that combination of luminosity and temperature are extremely unstable. They either expand to become cooler or shed their outer layers completely to become hotter. Yet HD 33579 is relatively stable, hardly even variable. This is thought to be due to its higher mass compared to most stars with similar temperature and luminosity. It has a radius of approximately 650 solar radii, comparable to Betelgeuse and larger than the orbit of Mars.

HD 33579 is an extremely rare type of star currently evolving for the first time through the yellow evolutionary void from being a blue hypergiant to becoming a red hypergiant. This means the star is often referred to as a yellow hypergiant although the spectral type of A3 means it is also described as a white hypergiant.

Although HD 33579 has not been formally listed in the General Catalogue of Variable Stars, analysis of Hipparcos photometry confirmed small amplitude variations in its brightness that had been reported in earlier research. Periods of 620 days and 105 days are found, plus other possible shorter periods. The total amplitude is only around 0.1 magnitudes. A statistical analysis of Hipparcos photometry showed a possible period of 27 days.
