= NGC 2439 =

Open cluster in the constellation Puppis

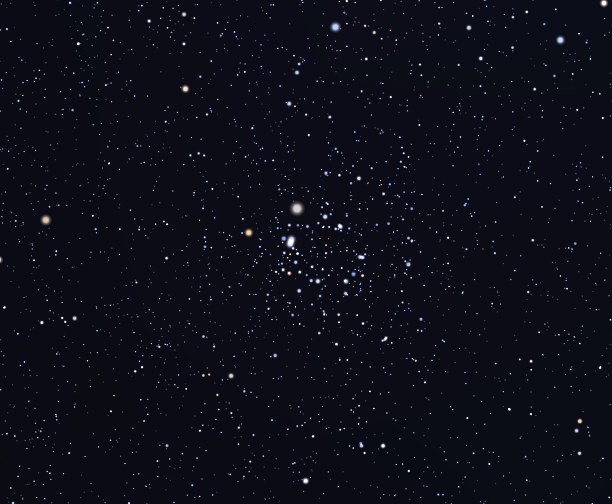
- NGC 2439 (taken from Stellarium)

Observation data (J2000 epoch)
- Right ascension: 07^{h} 40^{m} 45.0^{s}
- Declination: −31° 41′ 36″
- Distance: 3.855 kpc (12.57 kly)
- Apparent magnitude (V): 6.9
- Apparent dimensions (V): 10″

Physical characteristics
- Radius: 82 ± 23 ly (tidal)
- Other designations: Cr 158, C 0738-315

Associations
- Constellation: Puppis

NGC 2439 is a sparse open cluster of stars in the constellation Puppis. It has an apparent visual magnitude of 6.9, an angular size of 10 arcminutes, and is visible using a small telescope. This is a young cluster with age estimates in the range of 20–300 million years. It has a tidal radius of approximately 82 light years. No chemically peculiar stars have been found.

Distance estimates to this cluster vary widely. Piskunov and associates (2008) gave an estimate of 3,855 kpc. A value in the range 3–4 kpc means the cluster lies well below the Galactic Plane. It is positioned in a hole in the Milky Way's gas and dust, with the reduced absorption resulting in a lower than expected extinction of 1.27 in visual magnitude. This result raises the question of whether this cluster actually exists. It is positioned along the same line of sight as two groups of B-type supergiant stars. The nearer group is located at a distance of 1.03 kpc, while the second group is at 3.2 kpc.

== Gallery ==
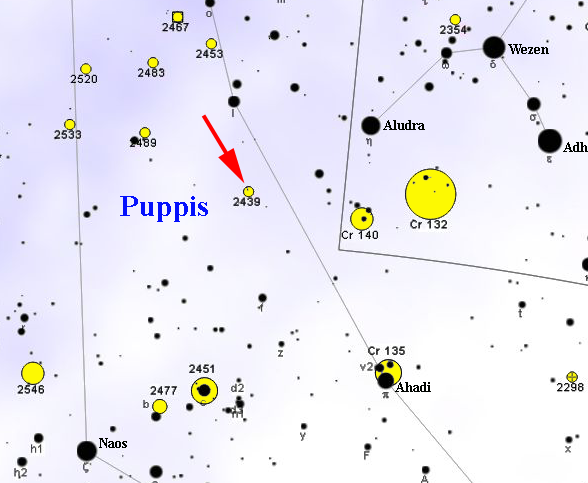
Map showing the location of NGC 2439
