= Omicron1 Centauri =

Star in the constellation Centaurus

ο^{1} Centauri
- Location of ο^{1} Cen (circled)

Observation data Epoch J2000.0 Equinox ICRS
- Constellation: Centaurus
- Right ascension: 11^{h} 31^{m} 46.07^{s}
- Declination: −59° 26′ 31.4″
- Apparent magnitude (V): +5.13

Characteristics
- Evolutionary stage: Yellow hypergiant
- Spectral type: G3_0-Ia
- B−V color index: +1.08
- Variable type: SRd

Astrometry
Radial velocity (R_{v})	−20.00 km/s
Proper motion (μ)	RA: −4.491 mas/yr Dec.: +1.604 mas/yr
Parallax (π)	0.3254±0.0734 mas
Distance	9,390 ± 330 ly (2,880±100 pc)
Absolute magnitude (M_{V})	−9.0

Details
Mass	27±5.4 M_{☉}
Radius	403±41 R_{☉}
Luminosity	210,000+88,000 −82,000 L_{☉}
Surface gravity (log g)	0.19 cgs
Temperature	5,700 K
Age	10–12 Myr

Other designations
- ο^{1} Cen, AAVSO 1127-58, CD−58°4100, GC 15818, HD 100261, HIP 56243, HR 4441, SAO 239145, CCDM J11318-5927

Database references
SIMBAD	data

Omicron^{1} Centauri is a yellow hypergiant star in the southern constellation of Centaurus. Its name is a Bayer designation that is Latinized from ο^{1} Centauri, and abbreviated Omicron^{1} Cen or ο^{1} Cen. It is approximately 9,400 light-years from Earth.

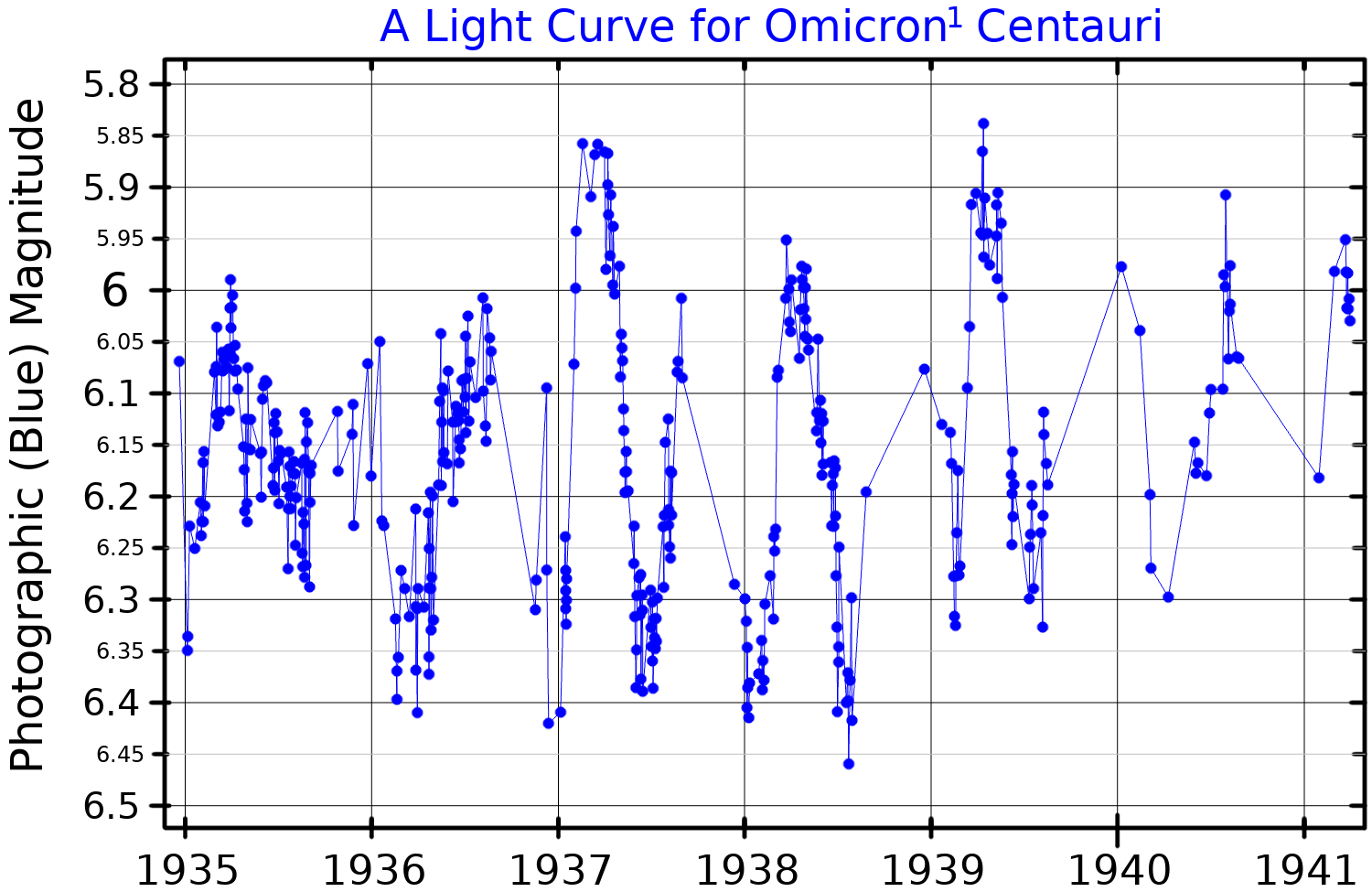
A light curve for Omicron^{1} Centauri, adapted from O'Connell (1961)

ο^{1} Centauri is a yellow G-type supergiant or hypergiant with a mean apparent magnitude of +5.13. Daniel Joseph Kelly O'Connell discovered that the star is a variable star by studying photographic plates taken from 1934 to 1952, and announced his discovery in 1961. It is classified as a semiregular variable star and its brightness varies from magnitude +5.8 to +6.6 with a period of 200 days. Other studies have reported only small brightness variations. It has been assigned the spectral types F8 Ia0 and F7 Ia/ab, indicating an F-type hypergiant or F-type supergiant respectively, but this has been revised to G3_0 Ia in 1989, indicating that it is a G-type hypergiant, and has been listed as the spectral standard for this class. The star is around 400 times larger than the Sun and roughly 210,000 times more luminous.

ο^{1} Cen forms a very close naked eye double star with ο^{2} Centauri, a hotter blue supergiant that may be physically associated. ο^{1} Cen also has an 11th magnitude companion only 13.5" distant, although it appears to be a foreground star unrelated to the other two.
