= Yellow hypergiant =

Class of massive star with a spectral type of A to K

Intrinsic variable types in the Hertzsprung–Russell diagram showing the yellow hypergiants above (i.e. more luminous than) the Cepheid instability strip

A yellow hypergiant (YHG) is a massive star with an extended atmosphere, a spectral class from A to K, and, starting with an initial mass of about 20–60 solar masses, has lost as much as half that mass. They are amongst the most visually luminous stars, with absolute magnitudes (M_{V}) around −9, but also one of the rarest, with just 20 known in the Milky Way and six of those in just a single cluster. They are sometimes referred to as cool hypergiants in comparison with O- and B-type stars, and sometimes as warm hypergiants in comparison with red supergiants.

== Classification ==
The term "hypergiant" was used as early as 1929, but not for the stars currently known as hypergiants. Hypergiants are defined by their '0' luminosity class, and are higher in luminosity than the brightest supergiants of class Ia, although they were not referred to as hypergiants until the late 1970s. Another criterion for hypergiants was also suggested in 1979 for some other highly luminous mass-losing hot stars, but was not applied to cooler stars. In 1991, Rho Cassiopeiae was the first to be described as a yellow hypergiant, likely becoming grouped as a new class of luminous stars during discussions at the Solar physics and astrophysics at interferometric resolution workshop in 1992.

Definitions of the term hypergiant remain vague, and although luminosity class 0 is for hypergiants, they are more commonly designated by the alternative luminosity classes Ia-0 and Ia^{+}. Their great stellar luminosities are determined from various spectral features, which are sensitive to surface gravity, such as Hβ line widths in hot stars or a strong Balmer discontinuity in cooler stars. Lower surface gravity often indicates larger stars, and hence, higher luminosities. In cooler stars, the strength of observed oxygen lines, such as O I at 777.4 nm, can be used to calibrate directly against stellar luminosity.

One astrophysical method used to definitively identify yellow hypergiants is the so-called Keenan-Smolinski criterion. Here all absorption lines should be strongly broadened, beyond those expected of bright supergiant stars, and also show strong evidence of significant mass loss. Furthermore, at least one broadened Hα component should also be present. They may also display very complex Hα profiles, typically having strong emission lines combined with absorption lines.

The terminology of yellow hypergiants is further complicated by referring to them as either cool hypergiants or warm hypergiants, depending on the context. Cool hypergiants refers to all sufficiently luminous and unstable stars cooler than blue hypergiants and LBVs, including both yellow and red hypergiants. The term warm hypergiants has been used for highly luminous class A and F stars in M31 and M33 that are not LBVs, as well as more generally for yellow hypergiants.

== Characteristics ==
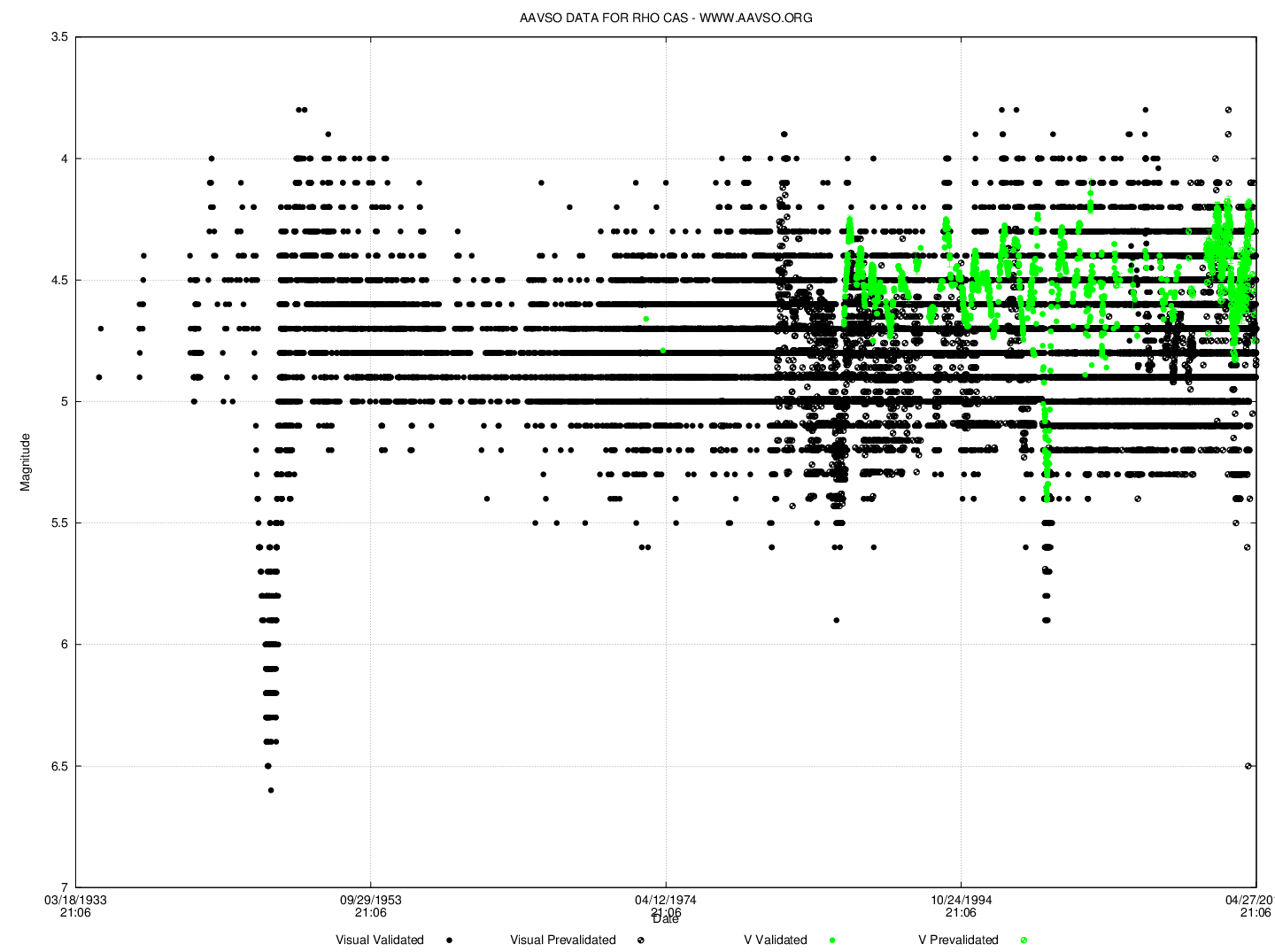
Visual light curve for ρ Cassiopeiae from 1933 to 2015

Yellow hypergiants occupy a region of the Hertzsprung–Russell diagram above the instability strip, a region where relatively few stars are found and where those stars are generally unstable. The spectral and temperature ranges are approximately A0-K2 and 4,000–8,000 K (3,730–7,730 °C; 6,740–13,940 °F) respectively. The area is bounded on the high-temperature side by the yellow evolutionary void where stars of this luminosity become extremely unstable and experience severe mass loss. The yellow evolutionary void separates yellow hypergiants from luminous blue variables although yellow hypergiants at their hottest and luminous blue variables at their coolest can have approximately the same temperature near 8,000 K. At the lower temperature bound, yellow hypergiants and red supergiants are not clearly separated; RW Cephei (roughly 4,000 K (3,730 °C; 6,740 °F), 295,000 L_{☉}) is an example of a star that shares characteristics of both yellow hypergiants and red supergiants.

Yellow hypergiants have a fairly narrow range of luminosities above 200,000 L_{☉} (e.g. V382 Carinae at 212,000 L_{☉}) and below the Humphreys-Davidson limit at around 600,000 L_{☉}. With their output peaking in the middle of the visual range, these are the most visually bright stars known with absolute magnitudes around −9 or −9.5 .

They are large and somewhat unstable, with very low surface gravities. Where yellow supergiants have surface gravities (log g) below about 2, the yellow hypergiants have log g around zero. In addition they pulsate irregularly, producing small variations in temperature and brightness. This produces very high mass loss rates, and nebulosity is common around the stars. Occasional larger outbursts can temporarily obscure the stars.

Yellow hypergiants form from massive stars after they have evolved away from the main sequence. Most observed yellow hypergiants have been through a red supergiant phase and are evolving back towards higher temperatures, but a few are seen in the brief first transition from main sequence to red supergiant. Supergiants with an initial mass less than 20 M_{☉} will explode as a supernova while still red supergiants, while stars more massive than about 60 M_{☉} will never cool beyond blue supergiant temperatures. The exact mass ranges depend on metallicity and rotation. Yellow supergiants cooling for the first time may be massive stars of up to 60 M_{☉} or more, but post-red supergiant stars will have lost around half their initial mass.

Chemically, most yellow hypergiants show strong surface enhancement of nitrogen and also of sodium and some other heavy elements. Carbon and oxygen are depleted, while helium is enhanced, as expected for a post-main-sequence star.

== Evolution ==
Yellow hypergiants have clearly evolved off the main sequence and so have depleted the hydrogen in their cores. The majority of yellow hypergiants are postulated to be post-red supergiants evolving blueward, while more stable and less luminous yellow supergiants are likely to be evolving to red supergiants for the first time. There is strong chemical and surface gravity evidence that the brightest of the yellow supergiants, HD 33579, is currently expanding from a blue supergiant to a red supergiant.

These stars are doubly rare because they are very massive, initially hot class O-type main-sequence stars more than 15 times as massive as the Sun, but also because they spend only a few thousand years in the unstable yellow void phase of their lives. In fact, it is difficult to explain even the small number of observed yellow hypergiants, relative to red supergiants of comparable luminosity, from simple models of stellar evolution. The most luminous red supergiants may execute multiple "blue loops", shedding much of their atmosphere, but without actually ever reaching the blue supergiant stage, each one taking only a few decades at most. Conversely, some apparent yellow hypergiants may be hotter stars, such as the "missing" LBVs, masked within a cool pseudo-photosphere.

Recent discoveries of blue supergiant supernova progenitors have also raised the question of whether stars could explode directly from the yellow hypergiant stage. A handful of possible yellow supergiant supernova progenitors have been discovered, but they all appear to be of relatively low mass and luminosity, not hypergiants. SN 2013cu is a type IIb supernova whose progenitor has been directly and clearly observed. It was an evolved star around 8,000 K (7,730 °C; 13,940 °F) showing extreme mass loss of helium and nitrogen enriched material. Although the luminosity is not known, only a yellow hypergiant or luminous blue variable in outburst would have these properties.

Modern models suggest that stars with a certain range of masses and rotation rates may explode as supernovae without ever becoming blue supergiants again, but many will eventually pass right through the yellow void and become low-mass low-luminosity luminous blue variables and possibly Wolf–Rayet stars after that. Specifically, more massive stars and those with higher mass loss rates due to rotation or high metallicity will evolve beyond the yellow hypergiant stage to hotter temperatures before reaching core collapse.

== Structure ==
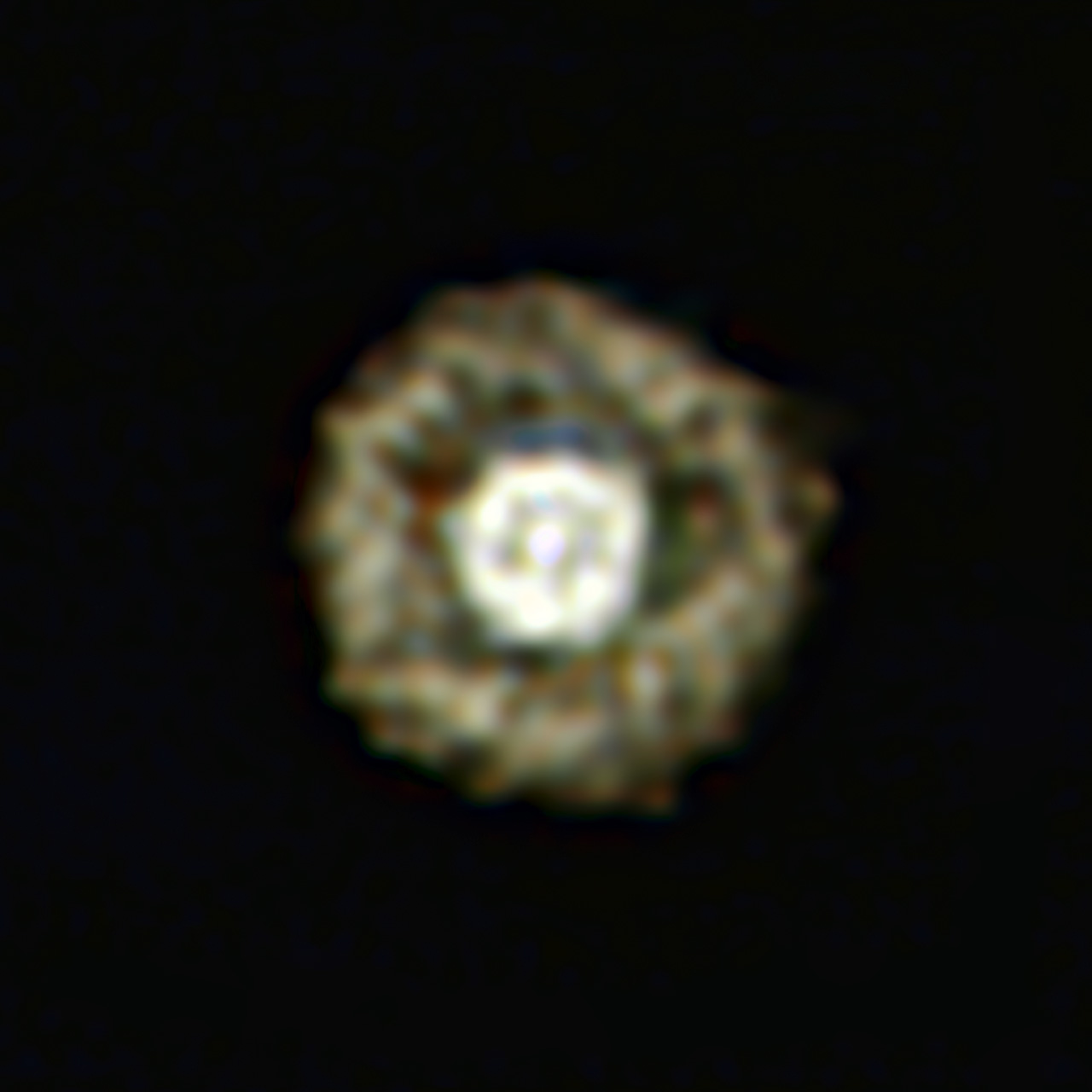
IRAS 17163-3907 is a yellow hypergiant that clearly shows the expelled material that probably surrounds all yellow hypergiants.

According to the current physical models of stars, a yellow hypergiant should possess a convective core surrounded by a radiative zone, as opposed to a sun-sized star, which consists of a radiative core surrounded by a convective zone. Because of their extreme luminosity and internal structure, yellow hypergiants suffer high rates of mass loss and are generally surrounded by envelopes of expelled material. An example of the nebulae that can result is IRAS 17163-3907, known as the Fried Egg, which has expelled several solar masses of material in just a few hundred years.

The yellow hypergiant is an expected phase of evolution as the most luminous red supergiants evolve bluewards, but they may also represent a different sort of star. LBVs during eruption have such dense winds that they form a pseudo-photosphere which appears as a larger cooler star despite the underlying blue supergiant being largely unchanged. These are observed to have a very narrow range of temperatures around 8,000 K (7,730 °C; 13,940 °F). At the bistability jump which occurs around 21,000 K (20,700 °C; 37,300 °F) blue supergiant winds become several times denser and could result in an even cooler pseudo-photosphere. No LBVs are observed just below the luminosity where the bistability jump crosses the S Doradus instability strip (not to be confused with the Cepheid instability strip), but it is theorised that they do exist and appear as yellow hypergiants because of their pseudo-photospheres.

== Known yellow hypergiants ==
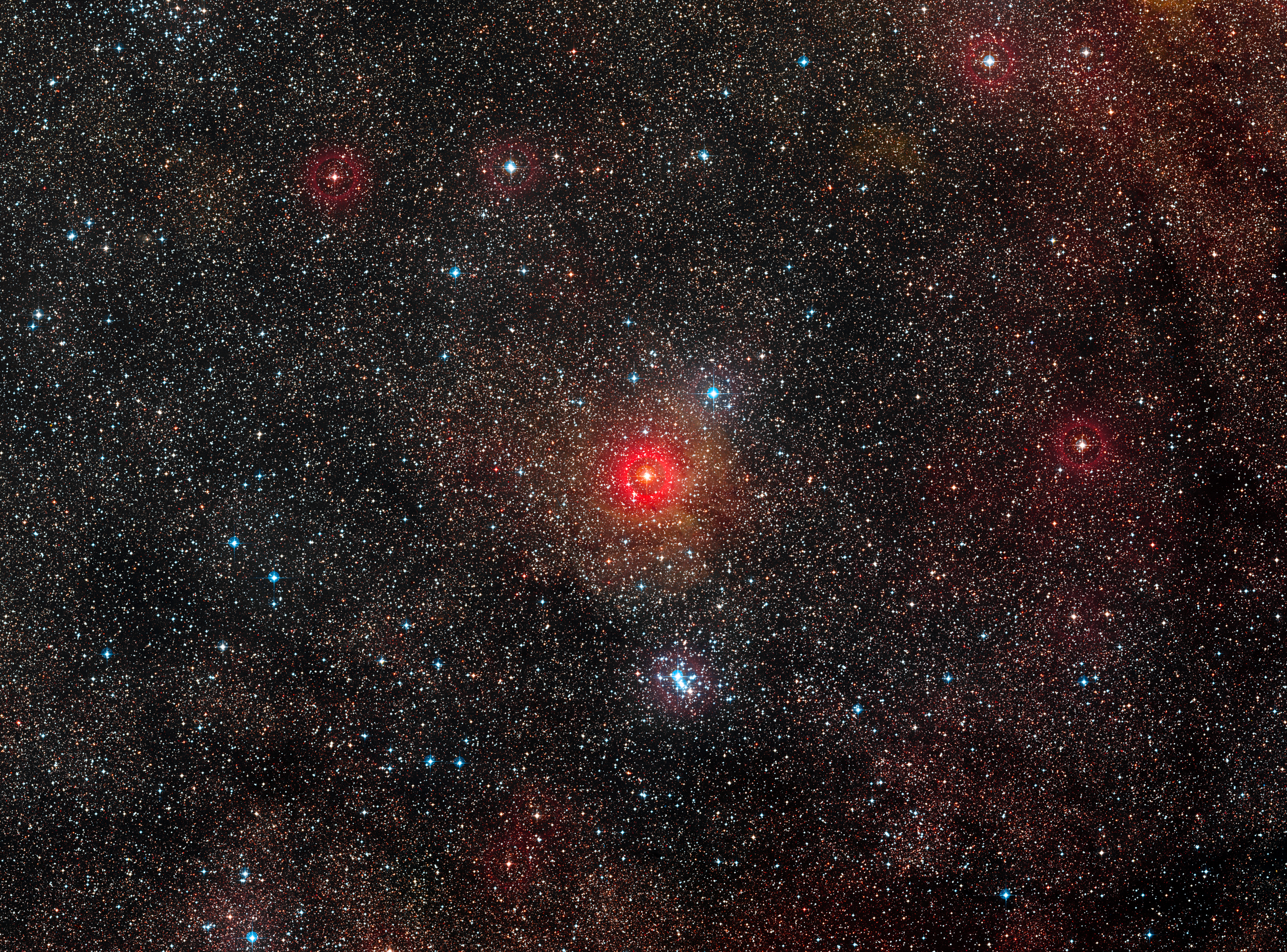
Yellow hypergiant HR 5171 A, seen as the bright yellow star at the center of the image.

=== In Milky Way galaxy ===
- Rho Cassiopeiae
- V509 Cassiopeiae
- Omicron1 Centauri
- R Puppis
- IRC+10420 (V1302 Aql)
- IRAS 18357-0604
- V766 Centauri (= HR 5171A)
- HD 179821
- IRAS 17163-3907
- V382 Carinae
- RSGC1-F15
- V810 Centauri
- VdBH 222#371
- GLIMPSE20-1
- 2MASS J17444840-2902163
- RW Cephei

=== In other galaxies ===
- HD 7583 (R45 in SMC)
- HD 33579 (in LMC)
- HV 2450 (in LMC, may be a red supergiant instead)
- HD 269723 (R117 in LMC)
- HD 269953 (R150 in LMC)
- HD 268757 (R59 in LMC)
- SP77 31-16 (in LMC)
- Variable A (in M33)
- Mothra (star) (in LS1)
- B324 (in M33)
- LGGS J013358.05+304539.9 (in M33)
- LGGS J013351.84+303827.4 (in M33)
- LGGS J013345.15+303620.1 (in M33)
- LGGS J013415.42+302816.4 (in M33)
- SP77 48-6 (in LMC)
- HD 271182 (in LMC)
- HD 271192 (in LMC)
- HD 270086 (in LMC)
- 10182-pr-1 (in NGC 2403)
- ZH 553 (in NGC 2403)
- ZH 912 (in NGC 2403)
- ZH 884 (in NGC 2403)
- 10584-11-1 (in Messier 81)
- 10584-8-1 (in Messier 81)
- 10584-8-2 (in Messier 81)
- ZH 244 (in Messier 81)
- ZH 224 (in Messier 81)
- 10584-13-2 (in Messier 81)
- ZH 1143 (in Messier 81)
- ZH 1406 (in Messier 81)
- 10584-25-2 (in Messier 81)
- 10584-13-3 (in Messier 81)
