= Sh 2-132 =

Diffuse nebula in Cepheus constellation

Sharpless 2-132
Nebula
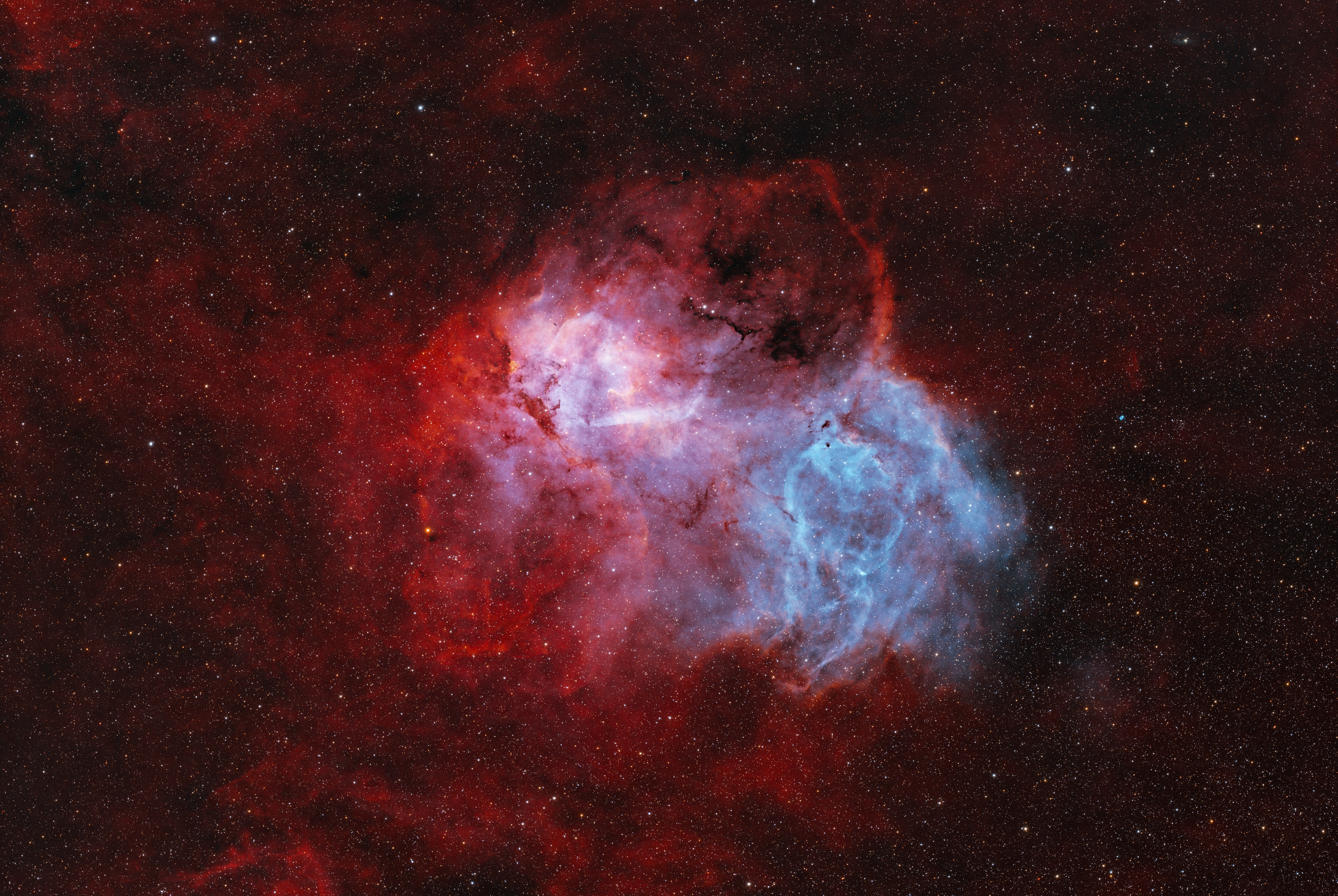
- Image of Sh 2-132 Nebula

Observation data: epoch
- Right ascension: 22^{h} 16^{m}
- Declination: 55° 53′ ″
- Distance: 10,400 ly (3200 pc)
- Constellation: Cepheus

Physical characteristics
- Radius: 125 ly
- Dimensions: 42'x 30'
- Designations: Dragon Nebula, Sh 2-132, LBN 470, LBN 473

Sh 2-132, also known as the Lion Nebula, is a diffuse nebula in Cepheus. It is part of the Cep OB1 Association and located in the Perseus Arm of the galaxy.

It is ionized by two Wolf-Rayet star, HD 211564 (WN3(h)-w) and HD 211853 (WN6o+O6I), along with many O and B-type stars. There are a number of dark nebula present in Sh 2-132 named LDN 1150, LDN 1154, LDN 1156, LDN 1161 and LDN 1162.
