= V382 Carinae =

Star in the constellation Carina

- Location of V382 Carinae (circled)

Observation data Epoch J2000 Equinox J2000
- Constellation: Carina
- Right ascension: 11^{h} 08^{m} 35.39^{s}
- Declination: −58° 58′ 30.1″
- Apparent magnitude (V): 3.84 – 4.02

Characteristics
- Spectral type: G0-4-Ia^{+}
- U−B color index: +0.96
- B−V color index: +1.26
- Variable type: Slow irregular variable

Astrometry
Radial velocity (R_{v})	+6.00 km/s
Proper motion (μ)	RA: −4.97 mas/yr Dec.: 1.67 mas/yr
Parallax (π)	0.52±0.17 mas
Distance	8,560+290 −270 ly (2,623+88 −83 pc)
Absolute magnitude (M_{V})	−9.0

Details
Mass	24±5 M_{☉}
Radius	616±69 R_{☉}
Luminosity	316,000+110,000 −117,000 L_{☉}
Surface gravity (log g)	0.50 cgs
Temperature	5,625±312 K
Metallicity	+0.05
Age	6.8 Myr

Other designations
- x Carinae, HR 4337, HD 96918, CP−58°3189, FK5 1289, HIP 54463, SAO 238813, GC 15329

Database references
SIMBAD	data

V382 Carinae, also known as x Carinae (x Car), is a yellow hypergiant in the constellation Carina. It is a G-type star with a mean apparent magnitude of +3.93, and a variable star of low amplitude.

== Variability ==
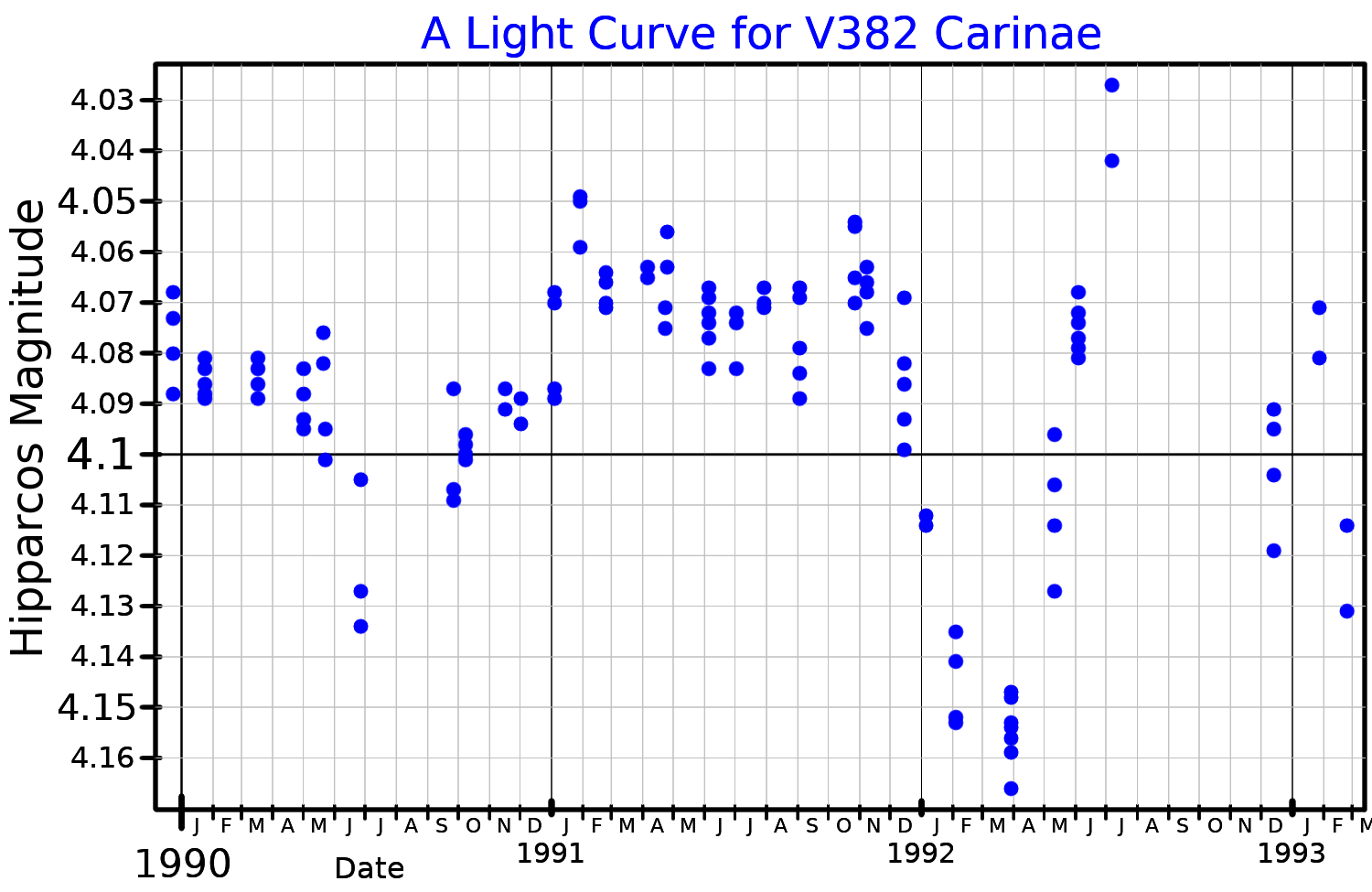
A light curve for V382 Carinae, plotted from Hipparcos data

The radial velocity of V382 Carinae has long been known to be variable, but variations in its brightness were unclear. Brightness variations were detected by some observers, but others found it to be constant. It was formally named as a variable star in 1981, listed in the General Catalogue of Variable Stars as a possible δ Cephei variable. It has been described as a pseudo-Cepheid, a supergiant with pulsations similar to a Cepheid but less regular.

Analysis of Hipparcos photometry showed clear variation with a maximum range of 0.12 magnitudes and the star was treated as an α Cygni variable. A period of 556 days was suggested, but it is not entirely consistent. It is now generally treated as a semiregular or irregular supergiant.

== Properties ==
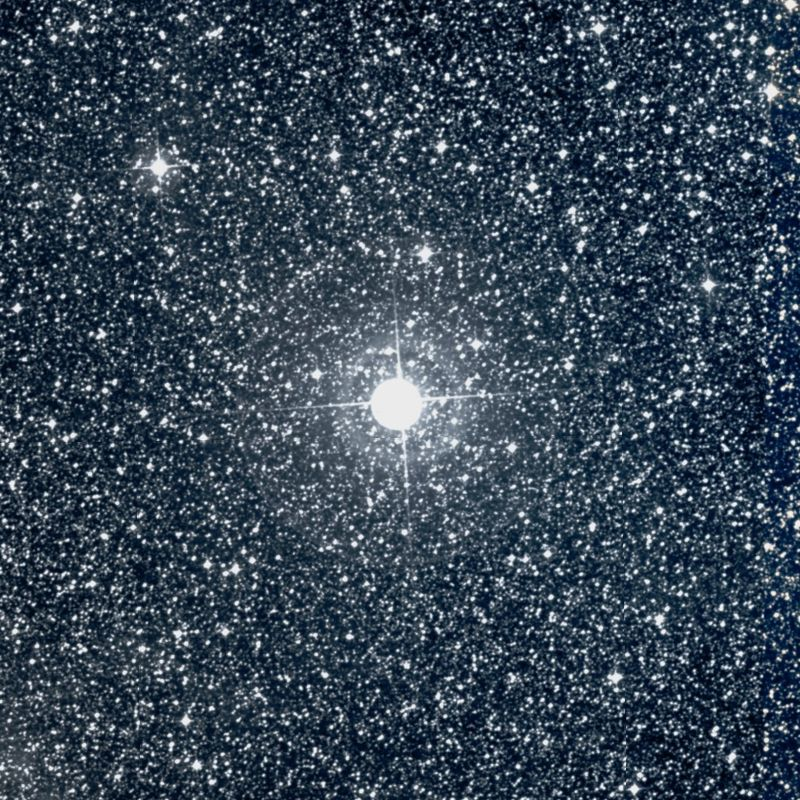
V382 Carinae

V382 Car is the brightest yellow hypergiant in the night sky (although b Velorum is a little bit brighter, at 3.81, and sometimes classified as a hypergiant), easily visible to the naked eye and brighter than Rho Cassiopeiae although not visible from much of the northern hemisphere. It is estimated to be 8,560 light years away, with around 620 times the radius of the Sun, and 320,000 times the Sun's luminosity. Were it placed in the center of the Solar System, its surface would extend into the asteroid belt. The low infrared excess suggest that V382 Carinae may be cooling towards a red supergiant phase, less common than yellow hypergiants evolving towards hotter temperatures.
