= IRC +10420 =

Hypergiant star in the constellation Aquila

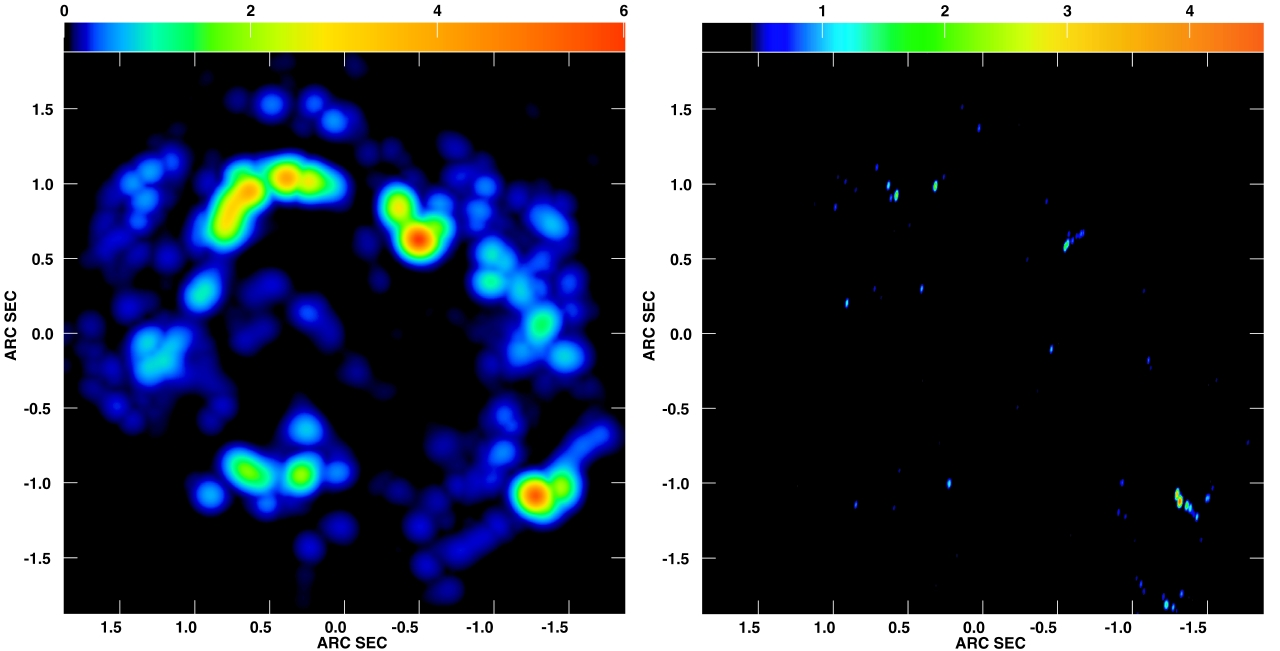
- MERLIN and e-VLBI observations of the OH masers in IRC +10420; Credit: Joint Institute for VLBI in Europe (JIVE)

Observation data Epoch J2000 Equinox ICRS
- Constellation: Aquila
- Right ascension: 19^{h} 26^{m} 48.098^{s}
- Declination: +11° 21′ 16.76″
- Apparent magnitude (V): 11.66 (variable)

Characteristics
- Evolutionary stage: Post-red supergiant yellow hypergiant
- Spectral type: F8Ia^{+}–A2I
- B−V color index: 2.32
- Variable type: Unique

Astrometry
Proper motion (μ)	RA: −1.858 mas/yr Dec.: −7.531 mas/yr
Parallax (π)	0.2040±0.0585 mas
Distance	approx. 16,000 ly (approx. 5,000 pc)
Absolute magnitude (M_{V})	−9.5

Details
Mass	~10 M_{☉}
Radius	265–391 (Note: Calculated, using the Stefan-Boltzmann law and the star's effective temperature and luminosity, with respect to the solar nominal effective temperature of 5,772 K: $$\sqrt{\biggl(\frac{5,772}{8,500}\biggr)^4 \cdot 330,000} = 265\ R_\odot.$$ $$\sqrt{\biggl(\frac{5,772}{7,000}\biggr)^4 \cdot 330,000} = 391\ R_\odot.$$) R_{☉}
Luminosity	330,000 L_{☉}
Surface gravity (log g)	0.01 cgs
Temperature	7,000–8,500 K
Metallicity [Fe/H]	−0.18 dex

Other designations
- IRC +10420, V1302 Aql, IRAS 19244+1115, AAVSO 1922+11

Database references
SIMBAD	data

IRC +10420, also known as V1302 Aquilae, is a yellow hypergiant star located in the constellation of Aquila at a distance of 4-6 kiloparsecs of the Sun.

== Discovery ==
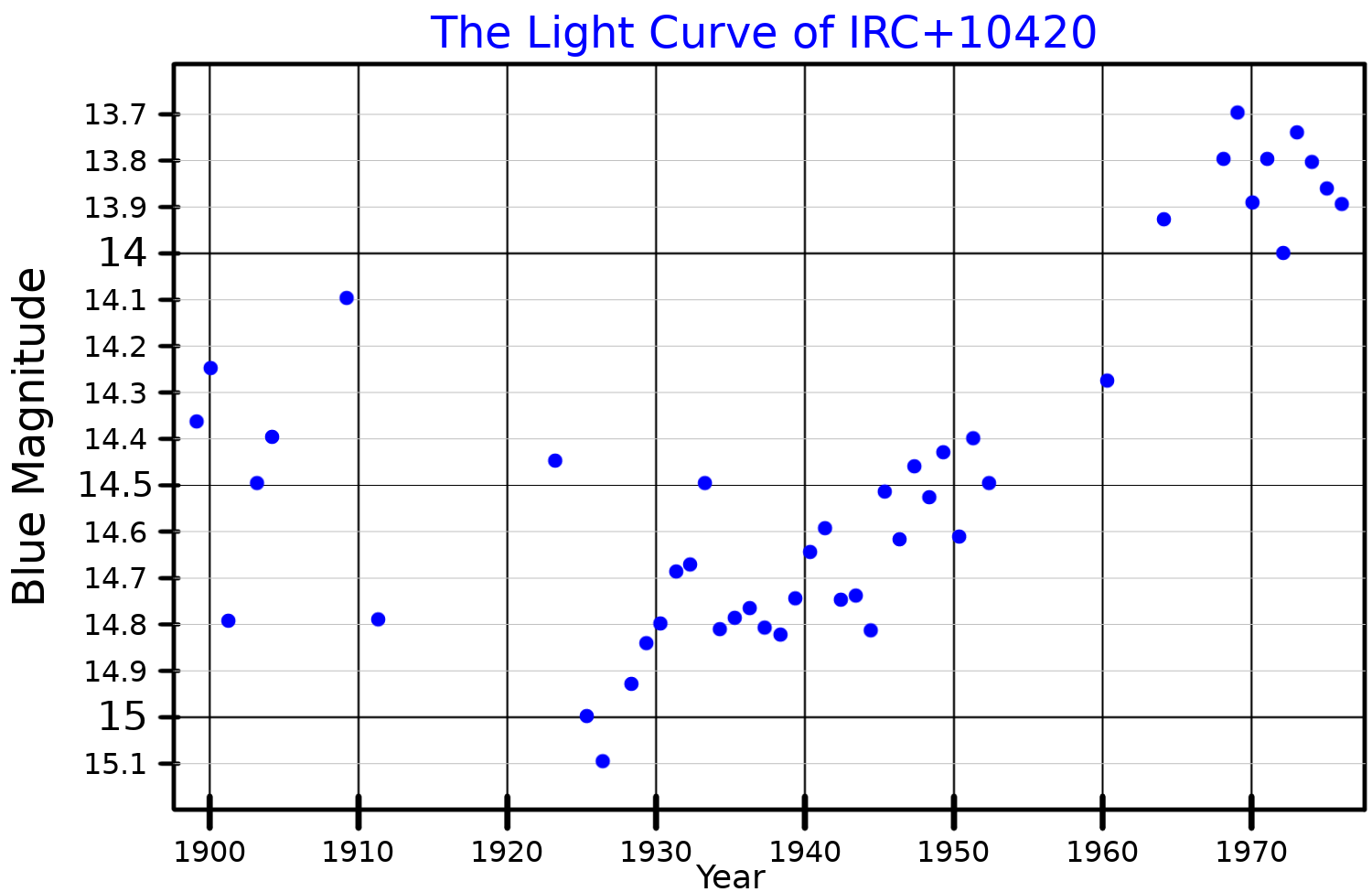
A blue band light curve for IRC +10420, adapted from Gottlieb & Liller (1978)

IRC +10420 was first identified in the 1969 Infrared Catalogue of 2.2 micron sources. It was quickly noted as a very unusual object after being detected at 20 microns as one of the brightest sources in the sky with a large infrared excess, and was compared to Eta Carinae during one of its outbursts. It was also discovered to be a strong source of OH maser emission.

It was formally catalogued as variable star V1302 Aquilae. Identification on historical photographic plates showed possible irregular variations of about a magnitude before 1925, followed by a smooth gradual increase in brightness from magnitude 15 to brighter than magnitude 14 by 1976.

Some authors had grouped IRC +10420 with the proto-planetary nebulae because of the surrounding nebulosity, but it was widely recognised as a highly luminous supergiant.

== Physical properties ==
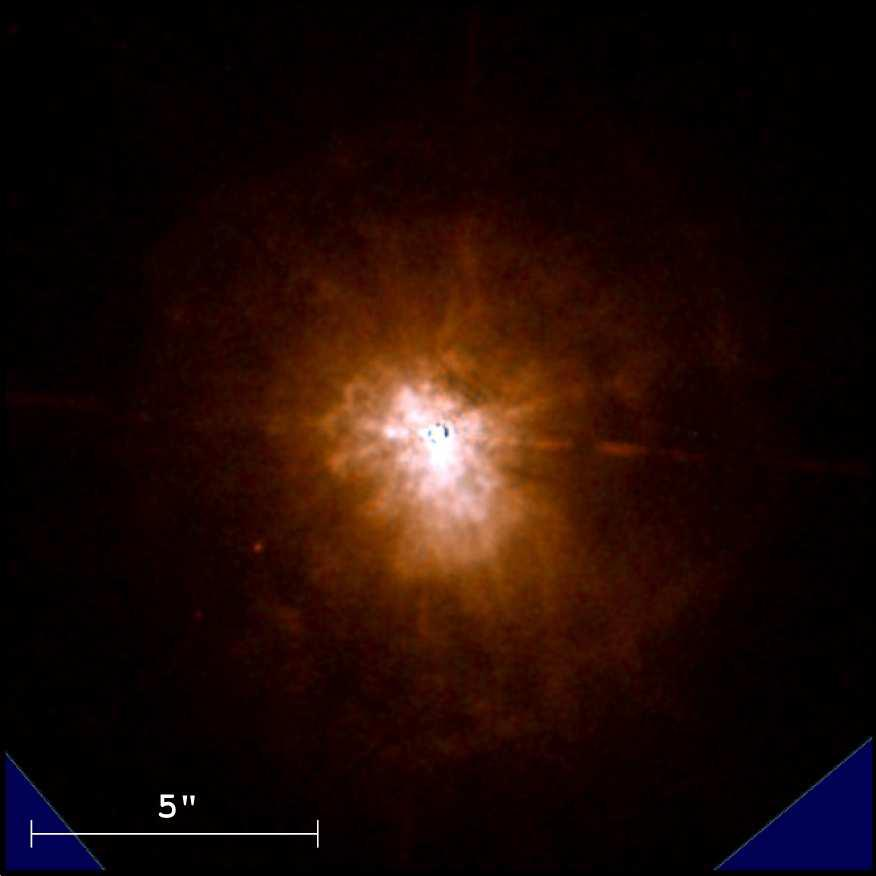
IRC +10420 and its circumstellar material

IRC +10420 is a luminous yellow hypergiant, with 330,000 times the solar luminosity. Its luminosity has been substantially revised over time: As it is surrounded by an asymmetrical dust shell with a cavity in the poles pointing towards Earth, most of the radiation escapes through the poles, causing luminosity estimates assuming an isotropic emitter to overestimate the actual luminosity by 55%.

IRC +10420's spectrum has changed from late F to early A in recent decades without experiencing changes in its luminosity. This suggests IRC +10420 is a former red supergiant that is evolving blueward on the Hertzsprung-Russell diagram to become a luminous blue variable, or Wolf–Rayet star. Models suggest it started its life as a 40-50 solar masses star that lost most of its mass due to strong stellar winds, leaving it with just 10 solar masses, and that the star - which actually has a high surface temperature - is totally enshrouded in the matter it has expelled, appearing as a fake photosphere, so IRC +10420 appears with a later spectral type, as humans see just the expelled dust and gas it has blown out during its life and not the star itself.

== Surrounding nebula ==
IRC +10420 is surrounded by a reflection nebula with a mass of 30-40 solar masses that has been made by the material expelled by the strong stellar winds of its central star. This nebula has been studied with the help of the Hubble Space Telescope, showing a complex structure that includes arcs, rays, and condensations and that has been compared to the one surrounding the red hypergiant VY Canis Majoris. The star and its surrounding material have been compared to IRAS 17163-3907.

== See also ==
- HD 179821 – Another heavily mass-losing yellow hypergiant or post-AGB star surrounded by a dust shell
- WOH G64 – An OH/IR red hypergiant once considered to be a yellow hypergiant and to have an overestimated luminosity assuming spherical shells
