= MTT 68 =

Binary star system in the constellation Carina

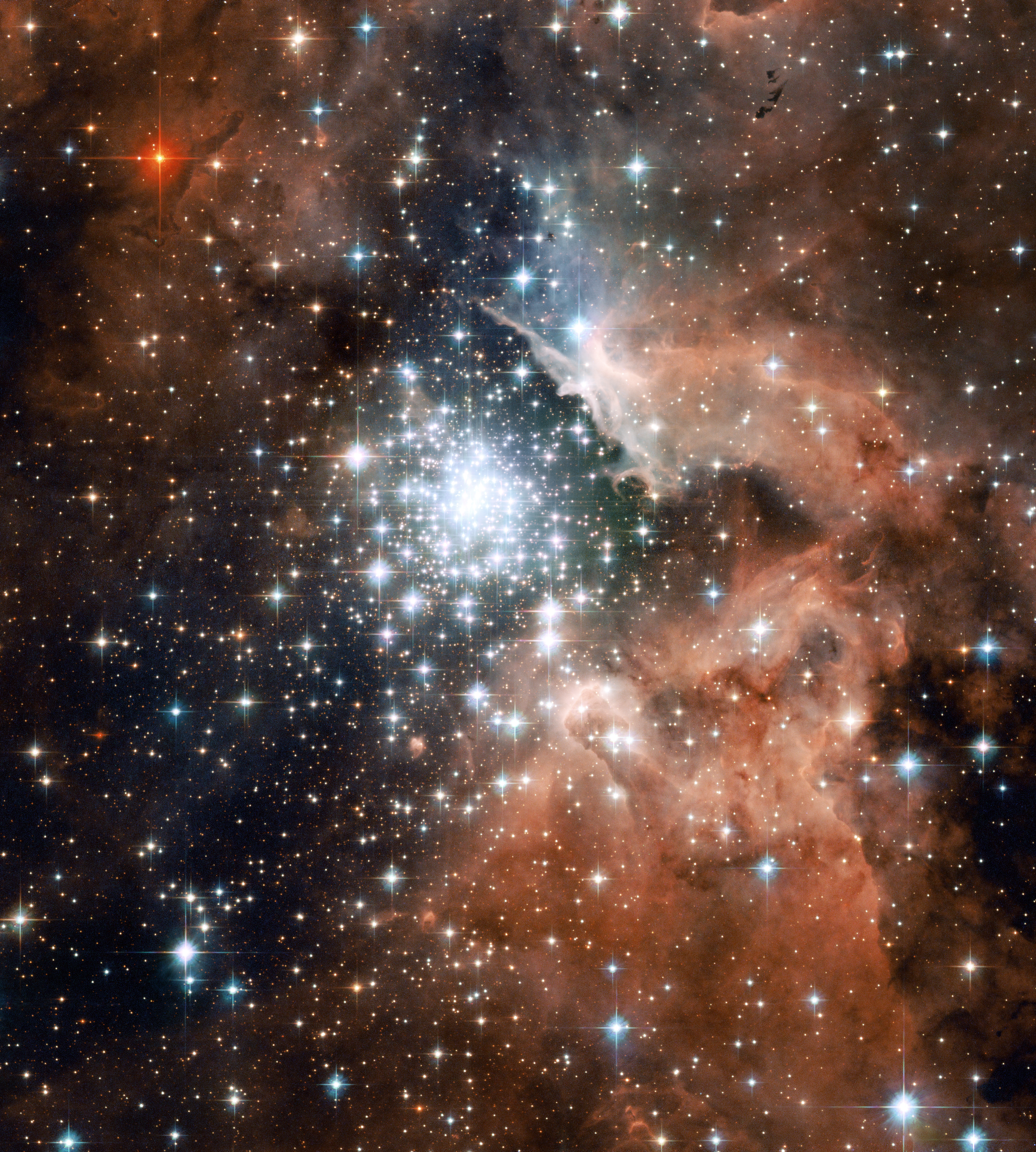
- MTT 68 is the bright very close pair of stars above and right of the red supergiant in the top left (north) corner of the image. Credit: NASA, ESA, and the Hubble Heritage (STScI/AURA)-ESA/Hubble Collaboration

Observation data Epoch J2000.0 Equinox J2000.0 (ICRS)
- Constellation: Carina
- Right ascension: 11^{h} 14^{m} 59.500^{s}
- Declination: −61° 14′ 33.89″
- Apparent magnitude (V): 14.72

Characteristics
- Spectral type: O2If^{*}
- Apparent magnitude (K): 8.74
- B−V color index: +1.59

Astrometry
Proper motion (μ)	RA: −8.601 mas/yr Dec.: +2.314 mas/yr
Parallax (π)	0.4742±0.6688 mas
Distance	7,600 pc
Absolute magnitude (M_{V})	−6.4 (−6.1/−4.9)

Details

A
Luminosity	1,138,000 L_{☉}

B
Luminosity	377,000 L_{☉}
Age	1 Myr

Other designations
- 2MASS J11145948-6114338, TIC 467481091, UCAC4 144-073052

Database references
SIMBAD	data

MTT 68 is a multiple star system located on the outskirts of the HD 97950 cluster in the NGC 3603 star-forming region, about 25,000 light years from Earth. It contains a rare example of an O2If^{*} star which is one of the most luminous and most massive known.

MTT 68 was first identified as being associated with NGC 3603 when it was listed as object 68 in a survey of the region by Melnick, Tapia, and Terlevich published in 1989. It is 1.4′ from the centre of the main ionising cluster for NGC 3603. In 2002, it was found to be a strong source of X-rays, indicating that it may be a close binary containing two massive stars. In 2013, it was classified with a spectral type of O2If^{*}, only the second known example after the prototype HD 93129A, also in the constellation of Carina. The spectral class indicates that this is a very hot supergiant star with emission lines of triple-ionised nitrogen stronger than those of doubly-ionised nitrogen.

MTT 68 is resolved into a pair of stars 0.38″ apart. The fainter component is 1.2 magnitudes dimmer than the brighter star. Although it is expected that MTT 68 is a binary due to its high x-ray luminosity, the observed companion is too distant to create the x-rays by colliding winds and a third, closer, companion is suspected.

Although MTT 68 is catalogued in Gaia Data Release 3, the parallax is too imprecise to give a useful distance. Analysis of the cluster as a whole allows a distance of 7.6 kpc to be calculated. At that distance, interstellar extinction causes stars to be dimmed by about 6.7 magnitudes and strongly reddened. Correcting for this places both of the component stars near the main sequence within initial masses of at least 100 M_{☉} and 40 M_{☉} respectively.

== See also ==
- NGC 3603-A1
- NGC 3603-B
