= NGC 3603-C =

Binary star system in the constellation Carina

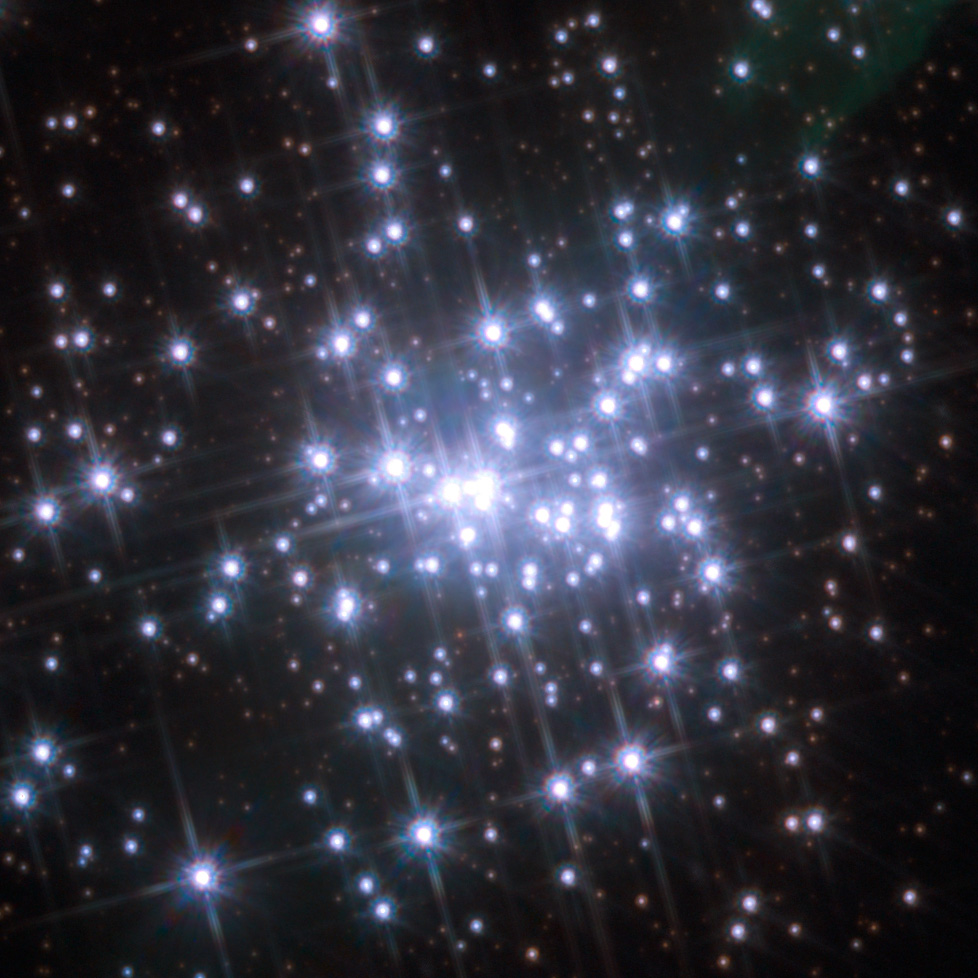
- C is the brightest star to the left of the very close A (three not quite resolved stars at the very centre of the image) and B pair at the centre in this HST image of the central region of HD 97950. Credit: NASA, ESA and Wolfgang Brandner (MPIA), Boyke Rochau (MPIA) and Andrea Stolte (University of Cologne)

Observation data Epoch J2000.0 Equinox J2000.0 (ICRS)
- Constellation: Carina
- Right ascension: 11^{h} 15^{m} 07.589^{s}
- Declination: −61° 15′ 38.00″
- Apparent magnitude (V): 11.89

Characteristics
- Evolutionary stage: main sequence
- Spectral type: WN6h+?
- B−V color index: 1.05

Astrometry
Proper motion (μ)	RA: +2.4 mas/yr Dec.: +2.8 mas/yr
Distance	7,600 pc
Absolute magnitude (M_{V})	−7.17

Orbit
Primary	C
Period (P)	8.89±0.01 d
Eccentricity (e)	0.30±0.04
Inclination (i)	71°
Periastron epoch (T)	2453546.61±0.18
Argument of periastron (ω) (secondary)	281±7°
Semi-amplitude (K_{1}) (primary)	200±23 km/s

Details
Mass	113 M_{☉}
Radius	26.2 R_{☉}
Luminosity	2,200,000 L_{☉}
Temperature	44,000 K
Age	1.5 Myr

Other designations
- NGC 3603-C, CD−60°3452C, CPD−60°2732C, HD 97950C, HIP 54948C, WR 43c, AAVSO 1110-60, NGC 3603 MDS 18

Database references
SIMBAD	data

NGC 3603-C (HD 97950C) is a single-lined spectroscopic binary star system located at the centre of the HD 97950 cluster in the NGC 3603 star-forming region, about 25,000 light years from Earth. The primary has spectral type WN6h and is among the most luminous and most massive known.

HD 97950 was catalogued as a star, but was known to be a dense cluster or close multiple star. In 1926, the six brightest members were given letters from A to F, although several of them have since been resolved into more than one star. Star C was shown to be a binary, but its companion has not been observed.

HD 97950C is a Wolf-Rayet (WR) star, with spectra dominated by strong broadened emission lines. Type WN6 indicates that ionised nitrogen lines are strong in comparison to ionised carbon lines, and the suffix h indicates that hydrogen is also seen in the spectrum. This type of WR star is not the classical stripped helium-burning aged star, but a young highly luminous object with CNO cycle fusion products showing at the surface due to strong conventional and rotational mixing, and high mass loss rates from the atmosphere. The emission lines are generated in the stellar wind and the photosphere is completely hidden. The surface fraction of hydrogen is still estimated to be 70%.

The two component stars of NGC 3603-C circle each other every nine days. It is assumed that the secondary is sufficiently smaller and fainter than the primary not to affect the calculation of its physical properties. The mass is estimated to be 113 M_{☉} and the luminosity over two million L_{☉}. Although the star is very young, around 1.5 million years old, it has already lost a considerable fraction of its initial mass. The initial mass is estimated to have been 137 M_{☉}, meaning it has lost 24 M_{☉}.

== See also ==
- NGC 3603-A1
- NGC 3603-B
