= Sanduleak =

Sanduleak may refer to:

- Nicholas Sanduleak, an American astronomer
- 9403 Sanduleak, a minor planet
- Sanduleak -69° 202, a blue supergiant that went supernova in 1987
