= HD 97950 =

Multiple star system in the constellation Carina

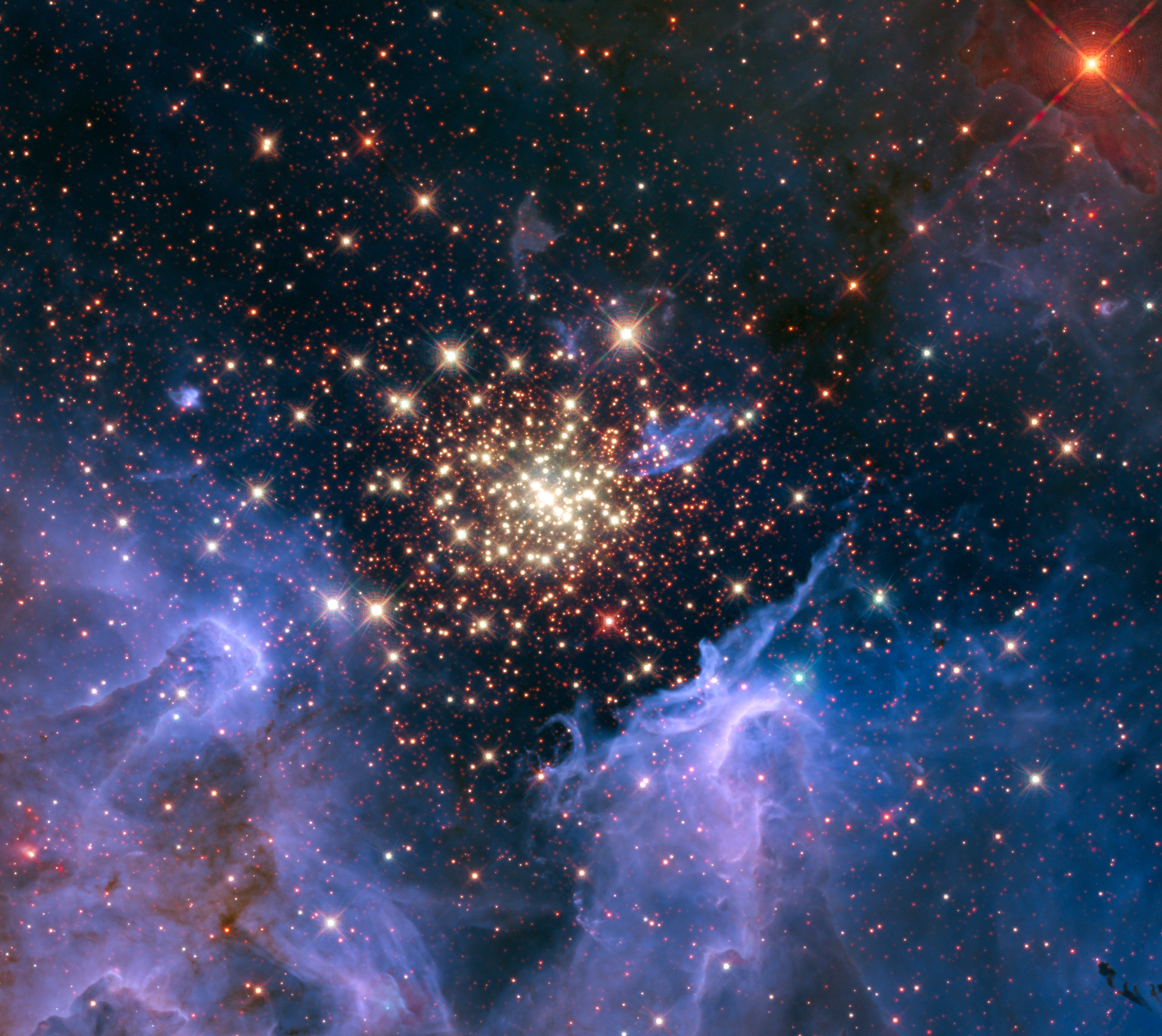
- HST image of the HD 97950 cluster

Observation data (J2000 epoch)
- Right ascension: 11^{h} 15^{m} 07.346^{s}
- Declination: −61° 15′ 38.52″
- Distance: 25 kly (7.6 kpc)
- Apparent magnitude (V): 9.03

Physical characteristics
- Mass: 19,000 M_{☉}
- Radius: 120"
- Main cluster in NGC 3603
- Other designations: HD 97950, NGC 3603YC, CD-60°3452, CPD-60° 2732, HIP 54948, MR 38, WR 43

Associations
- Constellation: Carina

HD 97950, is the central core of a super star cluster within the NGC 3603 H II region (similar to R136 within the Tarantula Nebula). It was catalogued as a single star, but has now been resolved into one of the densest clusterings of stars in the galaxy.

Only the six lettered stars A–F at the core of the cluster are typically referred to as components of HD 97950, while the remaining stars of the cluster and surrounding area are usually numbered as members of NGC 3603. The cluster itself is still called the HD 97950 cluster as well as the NGC 3603 young cluster (NGC 3603YC). There are no other notable groupings of stars in NGC 3603 and the HD 97950 cluster is often loosely referred to as simply NGC 3603.

== Members ==
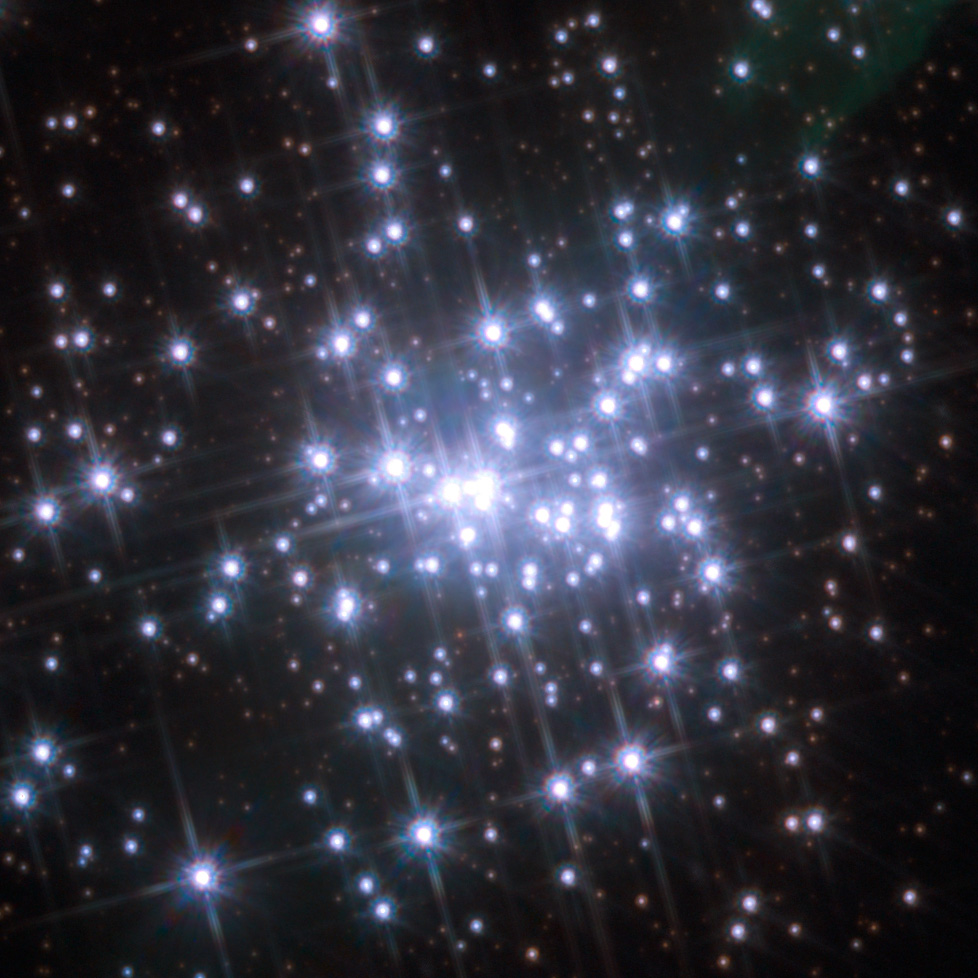
The core of the cluster, with A1/2/3 at the very centre, and B and C to its left

The main components are designated A1, A2, A3, B, and C, of which A1 and C are known to be spectroscopic binaries. A1a, A1b,B and C are all WN6h Wolf–Rayet stars, amongst the most massive and luminous known.

There are several dozen early O class stars (O3 and O4) in the cluster, mostly main sequence stars. There are just a handful of giants and supergiants including: one prominent early B supergiant, Sher 25; a highly luminous O3.5 supergiant, Sher 18; and an interesting carbon-rich O9.7 supergiant, Sher 23.

Over 7,500 stars have been identified in the cluster, with the least massive being smaller than the sun and the most massive over 100 M_{☉}. Stars less than about 4 M_{☉} have not yet reached the main sequence.

Generally, only the stars with letter naming are typically referred to as components of HD 97950, more stars are listed in NGC 3603.

BLW name	MDS number	Other names	Spectral type	m_{V}	M_{V}	Temperature (K)	Luminosity (L_{☉})	Reference
A1	30	WR 43a (HSW 1)	WN6h/WN6h	11.18	−7.8	42,000/40,000	2,455,000/1,514,000	
A2	31	HSW 4	O3V	12.53	−6.9	46,500	1,500,000	
A3	26	HSW 5	O3III	13.09	−6.4	46,500	863,000	
B	23	WR 43b (HSW 2)	WN6h	11.33	−7.9	42,000	2,884,000	
C	18	WR 43c (HSW 3)	WN6h	11.89	−7.3	44,000	2,239,000	
D1	49		O4V	12.64	−6.3	44,000		
D2	50		O5V	12.74	−6.2	41,000		
D3	52		O4V	13.68	−5.2	44,000		
E	19	MMM 104	O5.5III(f)	12.83	−6.1	41,000	1,038,000	
F	39	MTT 6	O5V	11.86	−6.1	41,000		
G	61	MTT 10	O5V	12.74	−6	41,000		

The number of WNh and early O stars exceeds any known cluster in the galaxy. The Quintuplet and Arches clusters each have around 20 young massive stars and may have masses comparable to the HD 97950 cluster, but they contain no O3 or WN6 stars at all. The rich red supergiant clusters such as Westerlund 1 are too old to contain such stars, although may be even more massive. R136 in the Large Magellanic Cloud contains stars more massive than any in HD 97950, as well as large numbers of early O stars, and the cluster as a whole may be ten times as massive.

It has been proposed that the star WR 42e, found 2.6 arcmin from the centre of the cluster, and J1117−6120, an O6V runaway a quarter of a degree away on the other side of the cluster, were both ejected in a 3-body interaction. Two of the stars then merged to form the extremely massive and luminous WR 42e.

== Mass ==
The HD 97950 cluster has a total photometric mass of 10,000–16,000 M_{☉}, and a dynamical mass of 19,000 M_{☉}. The constituent stars have apparently dynamical segregated with the more massive stars predominantly found at the centre of the cluster. The centre of the cluster has a density of 60,000 M_{☉} pc^{−3}, ten times the Orion Nebula and comparable to R136.

== Age ==
Fitting the main sequence, and pre-main sequence gives a cluster age of 1 million years or less. There is no clear main sequence turnoff, although the most massive stars are modelled best with an age of 2.5 million years, but are compatible with an age around one million years. A small number of stars, for example Sher 25, apparently show much greater ages and it has been suggested that there is either ongoing star formation, or an earlier burst of star formation. Other studies have estimated ages up to 2 million years, but the existence of the most massive and luminous stars provide a hard upper limit of 2.5 million years on the possible age.

This is one of the youngest clusters in the galaxy. The Arches Cluster is around 2.5 million years old, the Quintuplet cluster nearly double that, and the various open clusters containing red supergiants obviously even older. Even R136 is thought to be near to 2 million years old. Trumpler 14 in the Carina Nebula is thought to be as little as 300,000–500,000 years old, but is much less massive.
