= WR 42e =

Star in the constellation Carina

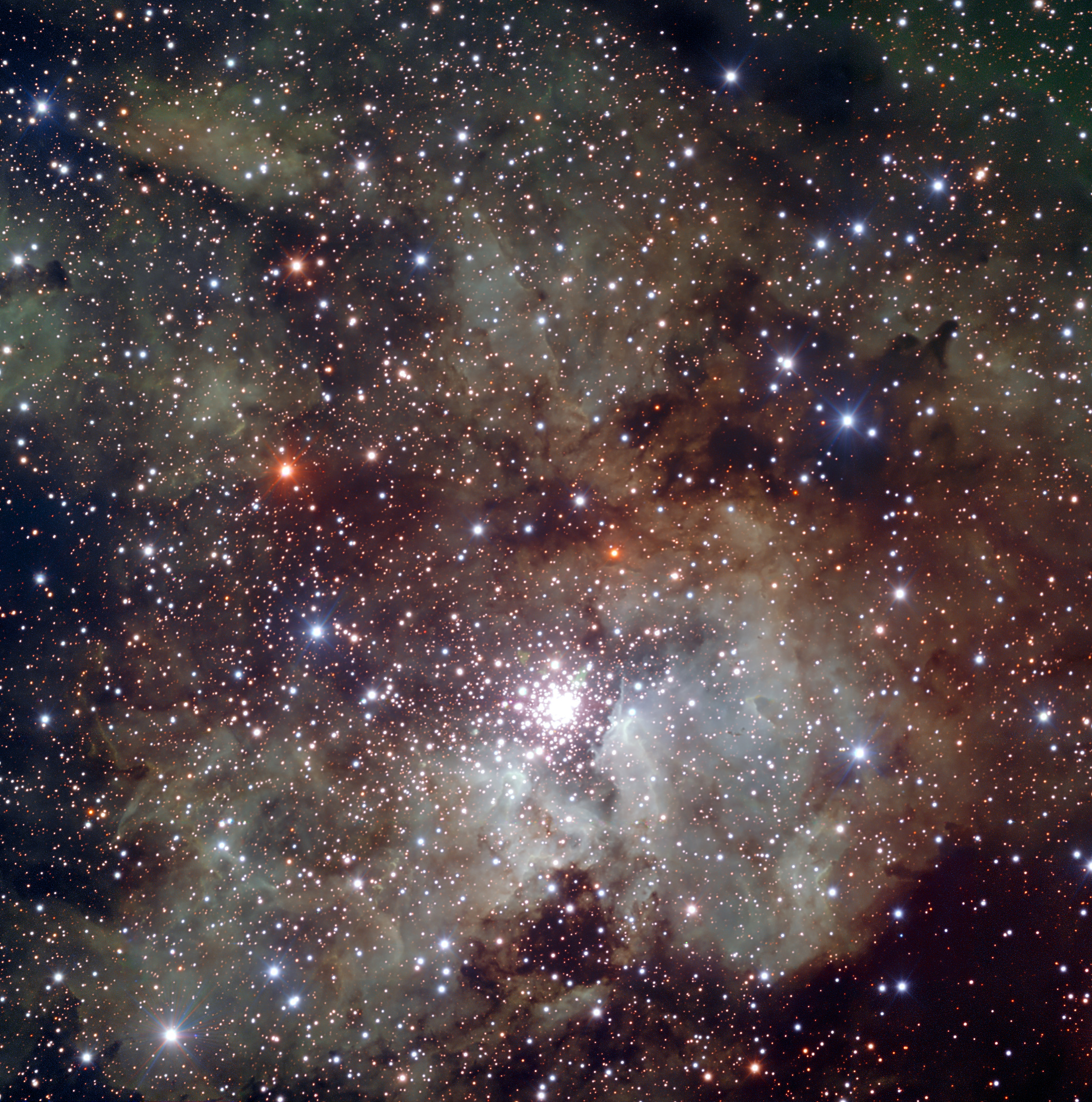
- WR 42e (circled) near HD 97950 in NGC 3603

Observation data Epoch J2000.0 Equinox J2000.0
- Constellation: Carina
- Right ascension: 11^{h} 14^{m} 45.513^{s}
- Declination: −61° 15′ 00.30″
- Apparent magnitude (V): 14.53

Characteristics
- Evolutionary stage: Wolf–Rayet
- Spectral type: O3If^{*}/WN6
- Apparent magnitude (U): 16.31
- Apparent magnitude (B): 16.05
- Apparent magnitude (V): 14.53
- Apparent magnitude (I): 12.05
- Apparent magnitude (J): 10.177
- Apparent magnitude (H): 9.466
- Apparent magnitude (K): 9.037
- U−B color index: +0.26
- B−V color index: +1.52

Astrometry
Proper motion (μ)	RA: −5.679 mas/yr Dec.: +1.908 mas/yr
Parallax (π)	0.1053±0.0157 mas
Distance	25,000 ly (7,600 pc)
Absolute magnitude (M_{V})	−6.92

Details
Mass	123 M_{☉}
Luminosity	3,200,000 L_{☉}
Temperature	43,652 K
Age	1-2 Myr

Other designations
- 2MASS J11144550-115001, SB04 #954, WR 42-1

Database references
SIMBAD	data

WR 42e (2MASS J11144550-115001) is a Wolf–Rayet star in the massive H II region NGC 3603 in the constellation Carina. It is around 25,000 light-years or 7,600 parsec from the Sun. WR 42e is one of the most massive and most luminous stars known.

WR 42e was first catalogued in 2004 as a member of NGC 3603, numbered 954. It was noted as having x-ray and H_{α} emission. A detailed study published in 2012 showed that the faint red star was actually a highly obscured (6.4 magnitudes in the visual) hot blue Wolf Rayet star and gave it the name WR 42e. Subsequent changes to the naming conventions for new galactic Wolf–Rayet stars mean it is also called WR 42-1.

WR 42e is located 2.7 arcmin west-northwest of the massive open cluster HD 97950 at the heart of NGC 3603, corresponding to 6 parsecs at the distance of NGC 3603. This is outside the compact core of the cluster where similar massive luminous stars are found. It is speculated that WR 42e was ejected in an unusual three-body encounter possibly involving the merger of two of the stars (which formed WR 42e) and the ejection of both the resulting objects.

The spectrum of WR 42e shows many characteristics of an OIf^{*} star, such as hydrogen Balmer series absorption lines and emission lines of ionised nitrogen and helium. The relative strengths of the nitrogen emission lines and the lack of absorption in the 468.4 nm helium line indicate a spectral class of O3 If^{*}. However, the H_{β} line shows a distinct emission wing. A P Cygni profile for this line is a defining character of the OIf^{*}/WN class and so WR 42e is assigned the type O3If^{*}/WN6.

== See also ==
- Initial mass function
