= Sanduleak −69 202 =

Supernova in the constellation Dorado

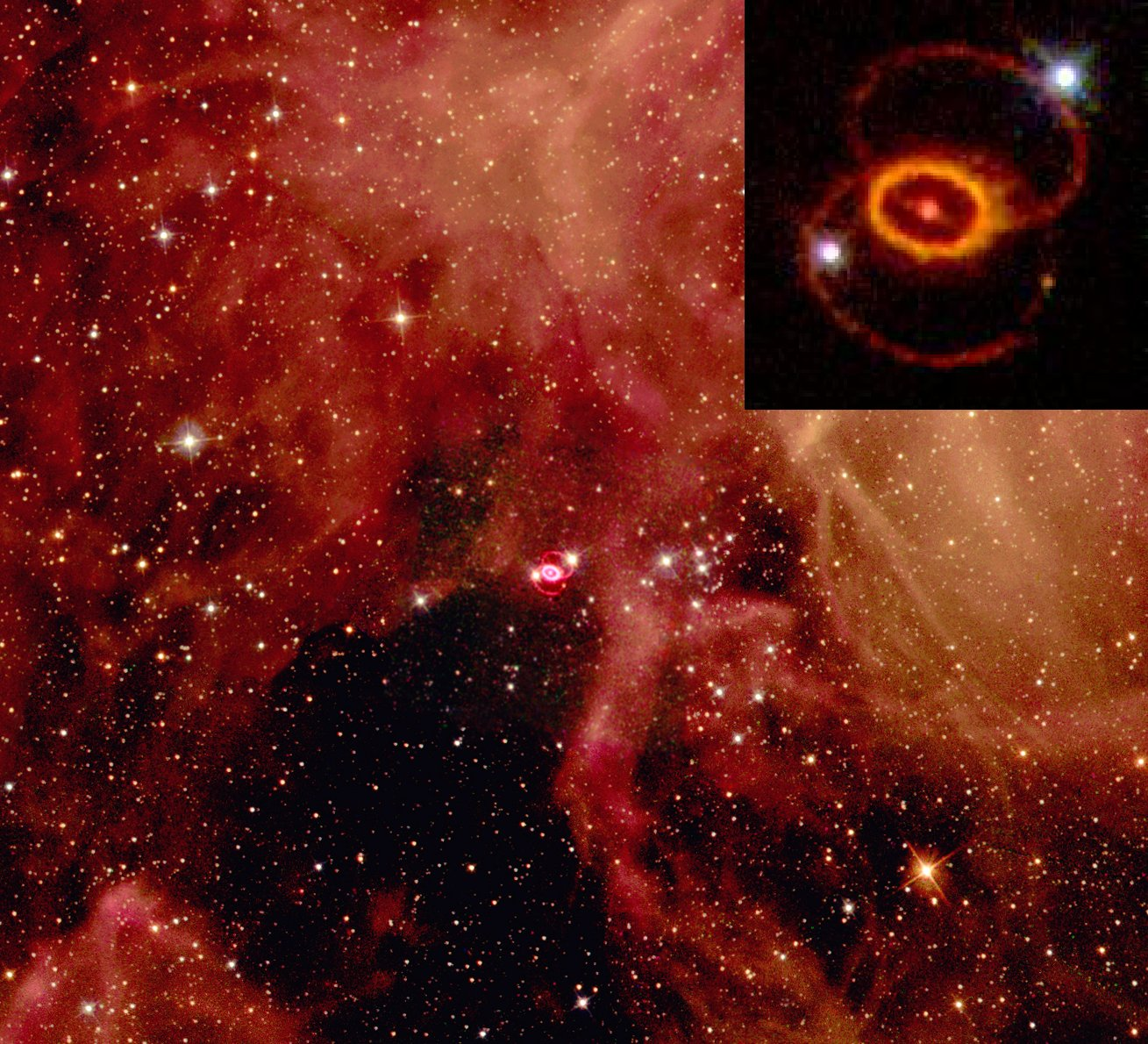
- SN 1987A was caused by the explosion of Sanduleak -69 202.

Observation data Epoch J2000 Equinox ICRS
- Constellation: Dorado
- Right ascension: 05^{h} 35^{m} 27.92^{s}
- Declination: −69° 16′ 11.1″

Characteristics
- Spectral type: B3 Ia

Astrometry
Distance	168,000 ly (51,400 pc)

Details
Mass	~20 M_{☉}
Radius	41.15 R_{☉}
Luminosity	~100,000 L_{☉}
Temperature	16,000 K

Other designations
- Sk -69 202, GSC 09162-00821

Database references
SIMBAD	data

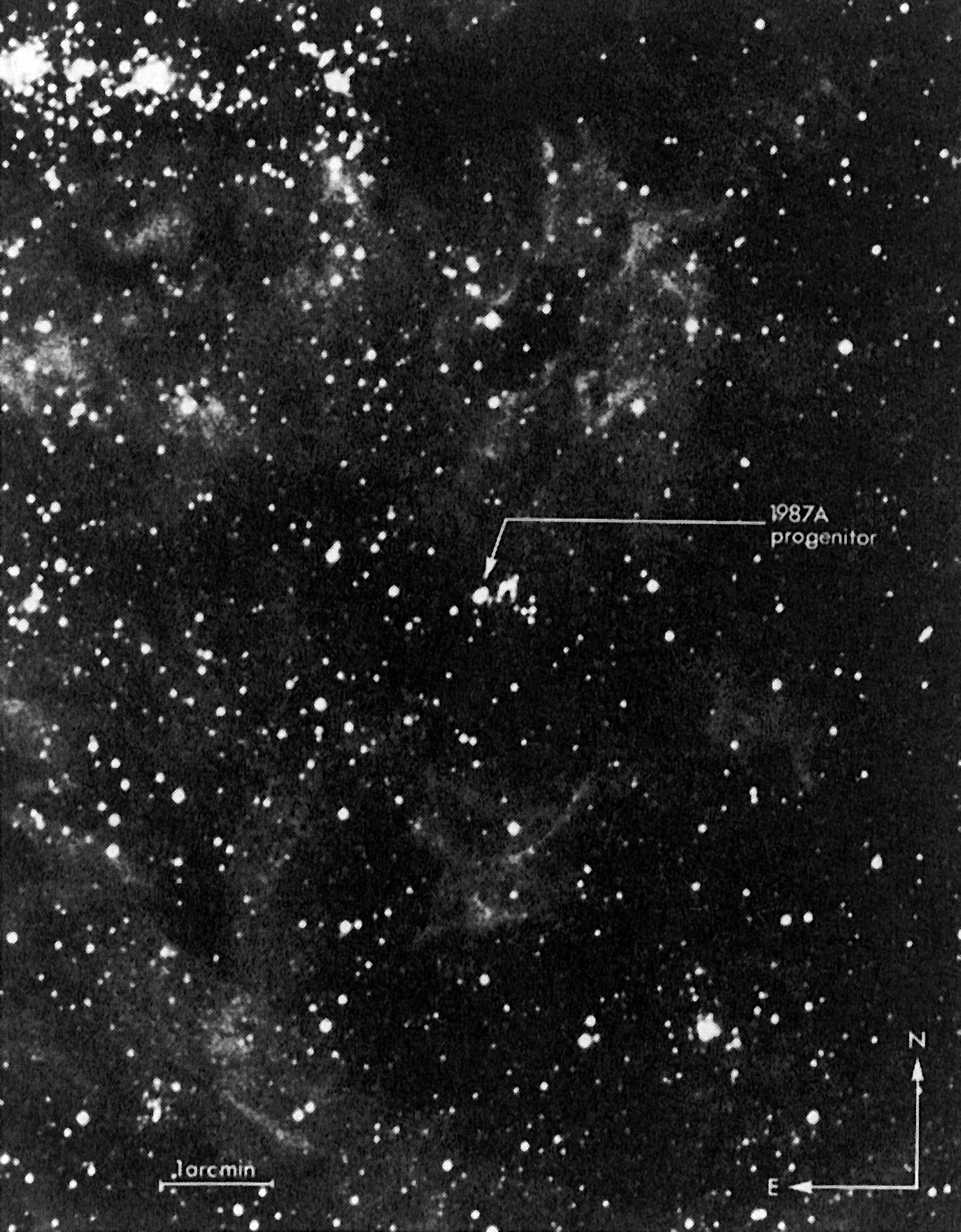
Sanduleak -69 202

Sanduleak -69 202 (Sk -69 202, also known as GSC 09162-00821) was a magnitude 12 blue supergiant star, located on the outskirts of the Tarantula Nebula in the Large Magellanic Cloud. It was the progenitor of supernova 1987A.

The star was originally charted by the Romanian-American astronomer Nicholas Sanduleak in 1970, but was not well studied until identified as the star that exploded in the first naked eye supernova since the invention of the telescope, when its maximum reached visual magnitude +2.8.

The discovery that a blue supergiant was a supernova progenitor contradicted the prevailing theories of stellar evolution and produced a flurry of new ideas about how such a thing might happen, but it is now accepted that blue supergiants are a normal progenitor for some supernovae.

Sher 25, HD 168625 and SBW1 possess bipolar nebulae that are very similar to that around Sk -69 202. It is speculated that Sk -69 202 may have been a luminous blue variable in the recent past, although it was apparently a normal luminous supergiant at the time it exploded.

== See also ==
- Neutrino astronomy
- List of supernovae
- History of supernova observation
