= HD 168607 =

Star in the constellation Sagittarius

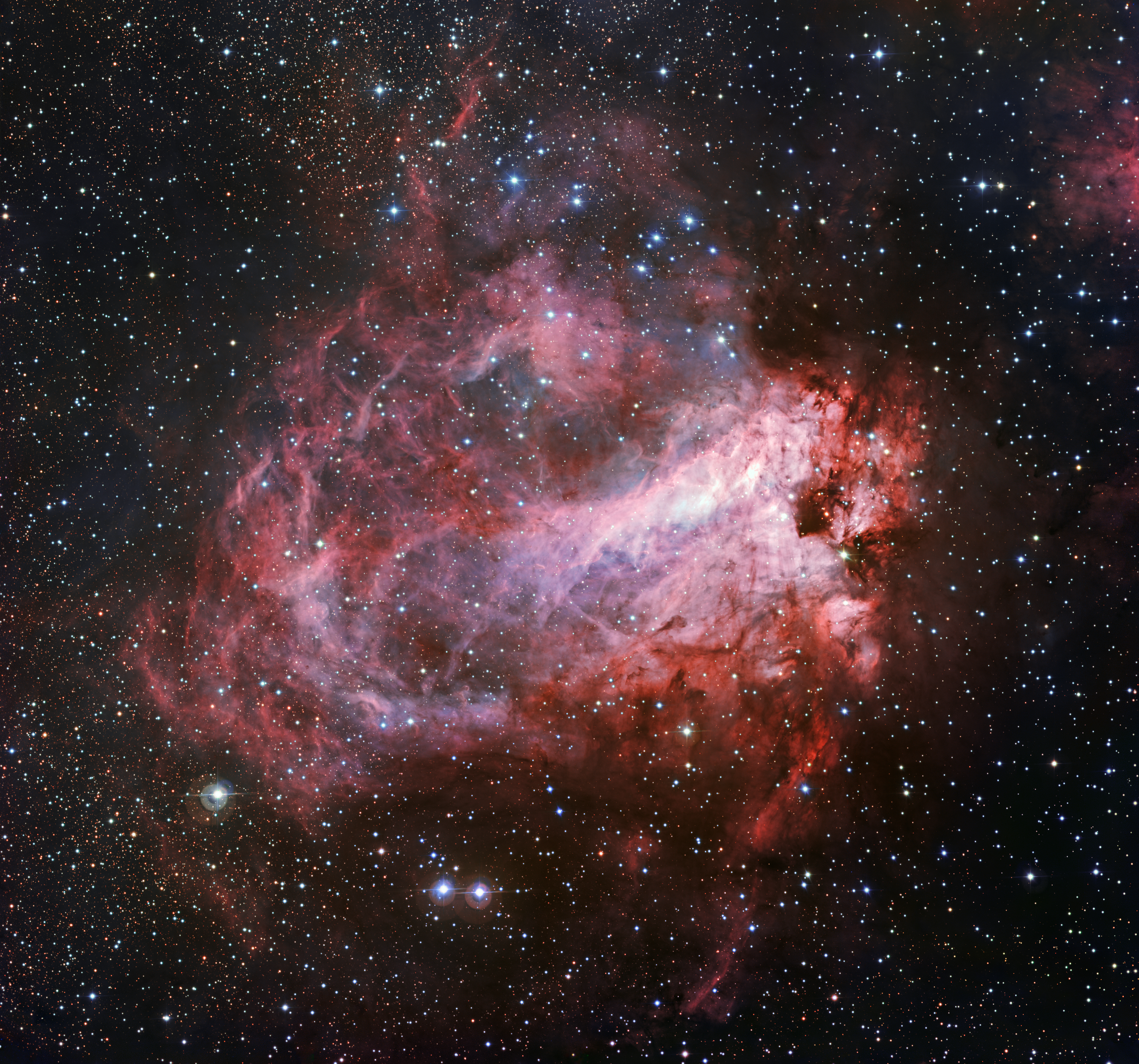
- HD 168607 is the right star of the pair below the Omega Nebula. The other is the hypergiant HD 168625.

Observation data Epoch J2000 Equinox ICRS
- Constellation: Sagittarius
- Right ascension: 18^{h} 21^{m} 14.889^{s}
- Declination: −16° 22′ 31.76″
- Apparent magnitude (V): 8.12 - 8.29

Characteristics
- Spectral type: B9Ia^{+}
- U−B color index: 0.41
- B−V color index: 1.54
- J−K color index: 1.06
- Variable type: LBV

Astrometry
Radial velocity (R_{v})	−30 km/s
Proper motion (μ)	RA: 0.563 mas/yr Dec.: −1.468 mas/yr
Parallax (π)	0.6438±0.0603 mas
Distance	5,100 ± 500 ly (1,600 ± 100 pc)
Absolute magnitude (M_{V})	−8.4

Details
Radius	172+9 −7 R_{☉}
Luminosity	126,000 to 158,000 L_{☉}
Surface gravity (log g)	1.0 cgs
Temperature	9,500 to 11,500 K

Other designations
- V4029 Sgr, HD 168607, BD−16°4829, SAO 161374, HIP 89956, AAVSO 1815-16

Database references
SIMBAD	data

HD 168607 (V4029 Sagittarii) is a blue hypergiant and luminous blue variable (LBV) star located in the constellation of Sagittarius, easy to see with amateur telescopes. It forms a pair with HD 168625, also a blue hypergiant and possible luminous blue variable, that can be seen at the south-east of M17, the Omega Nebula.

== Physical properties ==
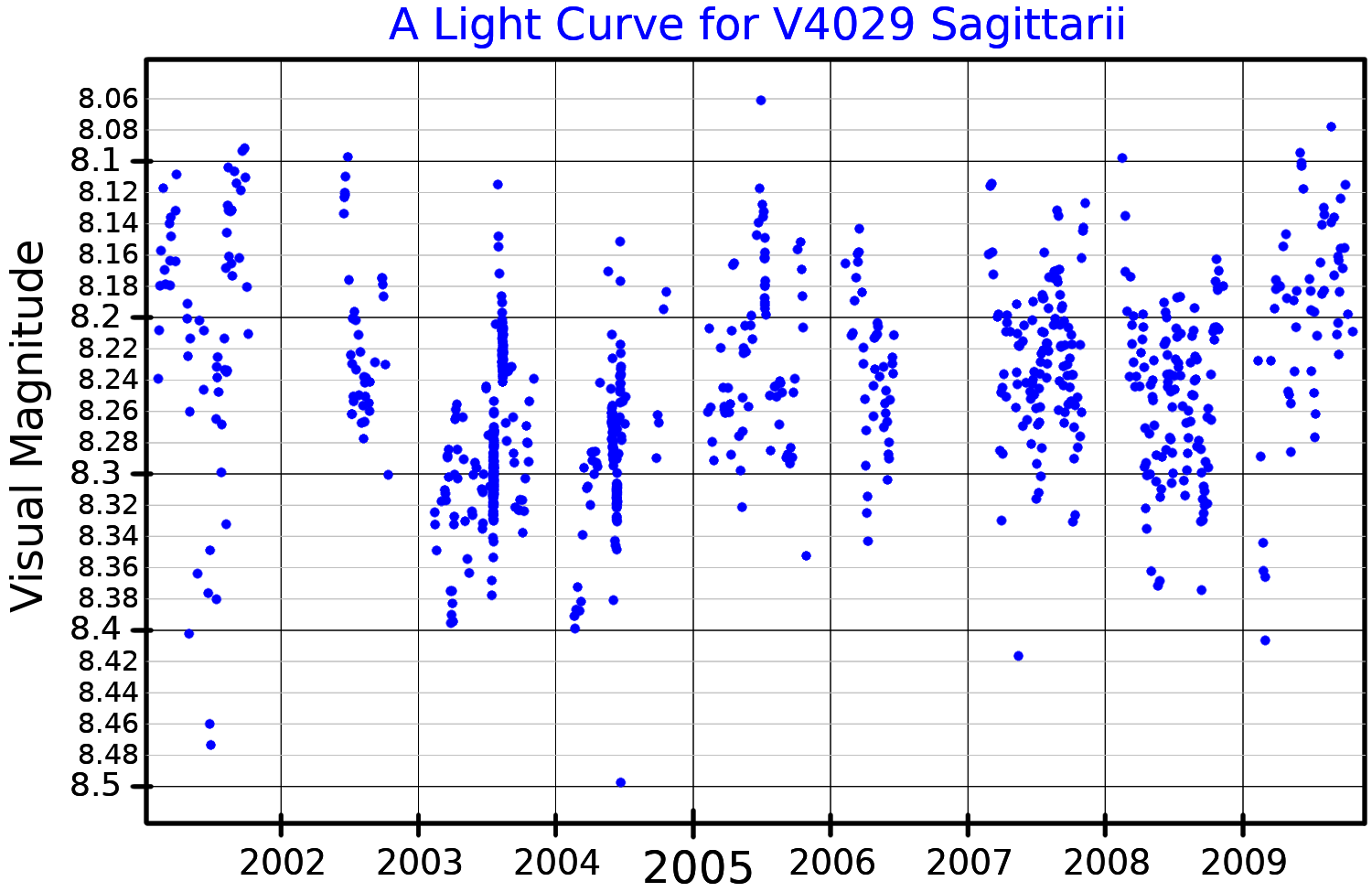
A visual band light curve light curve for V4029 Sagittarii, plotted from ASAS data

HD 168607 was estimated to be about as far away as is the Omega Nebula (2.2 kiloparsecs, 7,200 light years, from the Sun) and no respective measurements have been found that discount physical association with HD 168625. Assuming this distance is correct, this star is 240,000 times brighter than the Sun with a surface temperature of 9,300 K. The Gaia Data Release 2 parallax of 0.6438±0.0603 mas implies a closer distance of about 1,500 pc.

In 1977, Christiaan Sterken announced that HD 168607 is a variable star. It was given its variable star designation, V4029 Sagittarii, in 1979. The apparent magnitude of this star or star system was observed to vary by 0.25 to 0.30 magnitudes with a period of 64 days when it was first identified as an α Cygni variable. Unlike its neighbour HD 168625, no nebula has been found around this star. It is classified in the General Catalogue of Variable Stars as a luminous blue variable or S Doradus variable with a maximum and minimum visual magnitude of 8.12 and 8.29 respectively. Although it is suspected of being in, or about to enter, an S Doradus phase, no outbursts have been observed. A magnitude variation between 8.05 and 8.41 is reported from a broader range of observations.

HD 168607 is thought to have had a mass between 25 and 30 M_{☉} when it first formed on the main sequence, but now much less. Analysis of its period and photospheric abundances suggest that it has evolved through a red supergiant stage and has now expelled its outer atmosphere and increased its temperature again.
