= QZ Aurigae =

Nova seen in 1964

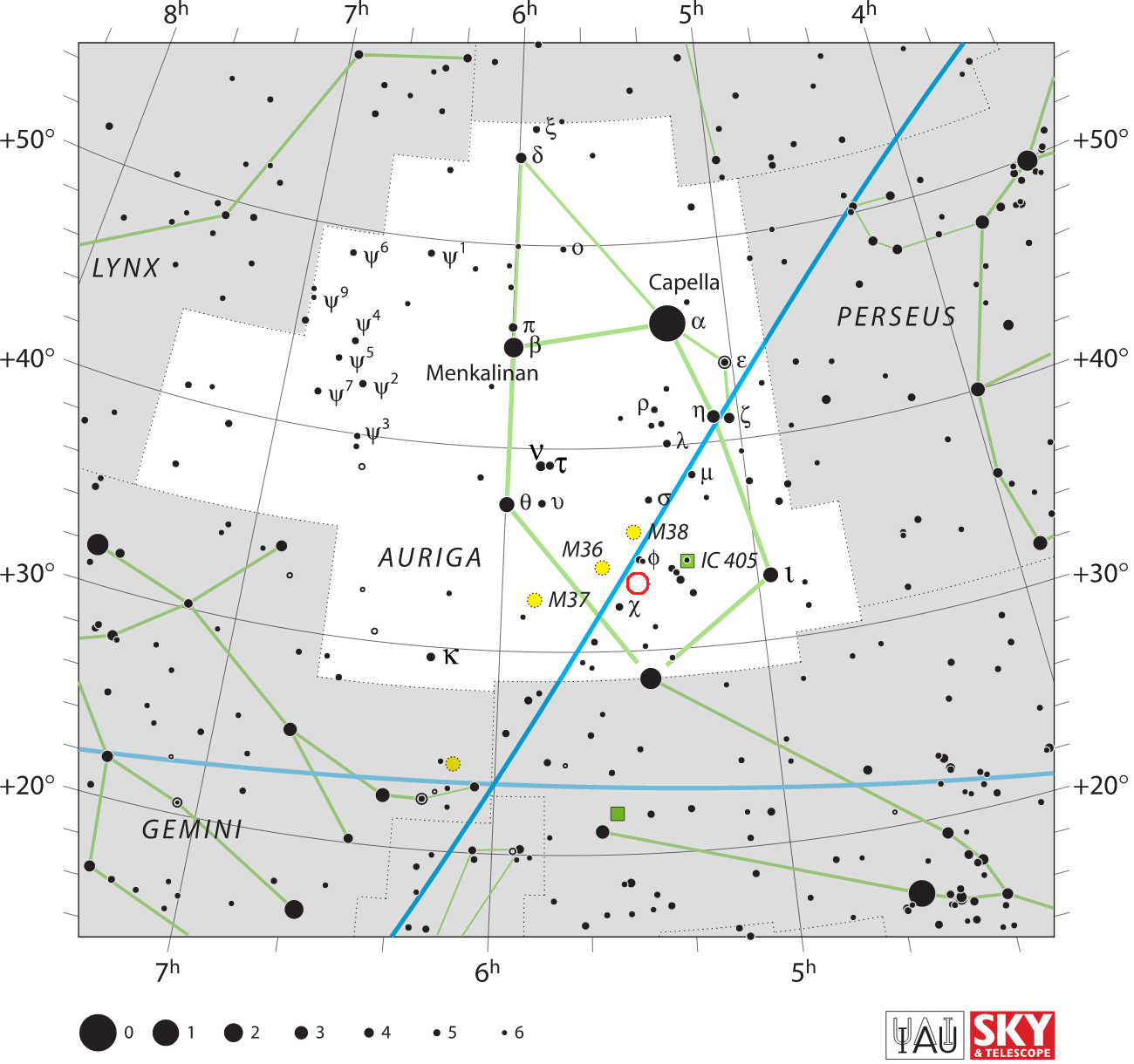
- Location of QZ Aurigae (circled in red)

Observation data Epoch J2000 Equinox ICRS
- Constellation: Auriga
- Right ascension: 05^{h} 28^{m} 34.078^{s}
- Declination: 33° 18′ 21.78″
- Apparent magnitude (V): 5.0Max. 17.0Min.

Characteristics
- Apparent magnitude (G): 16.87±0.01
- Variable type: Classical Nova, eclipsing binary

Astrometry
Proper motion (μ)	RA: 0.103±0.088 mas/yr Dec.: −2.988±0.062 mas/yr
Parallax (π)	0.4000±0.0778 mas
Distance	3200+4030 −330 pc

Other designations
- Nova Aur 1964, AAVSO 0522+33, Gaia DR2 3449050362952844288, Gaia DR3 3449050362952844288

Database references
SIMBAD	data

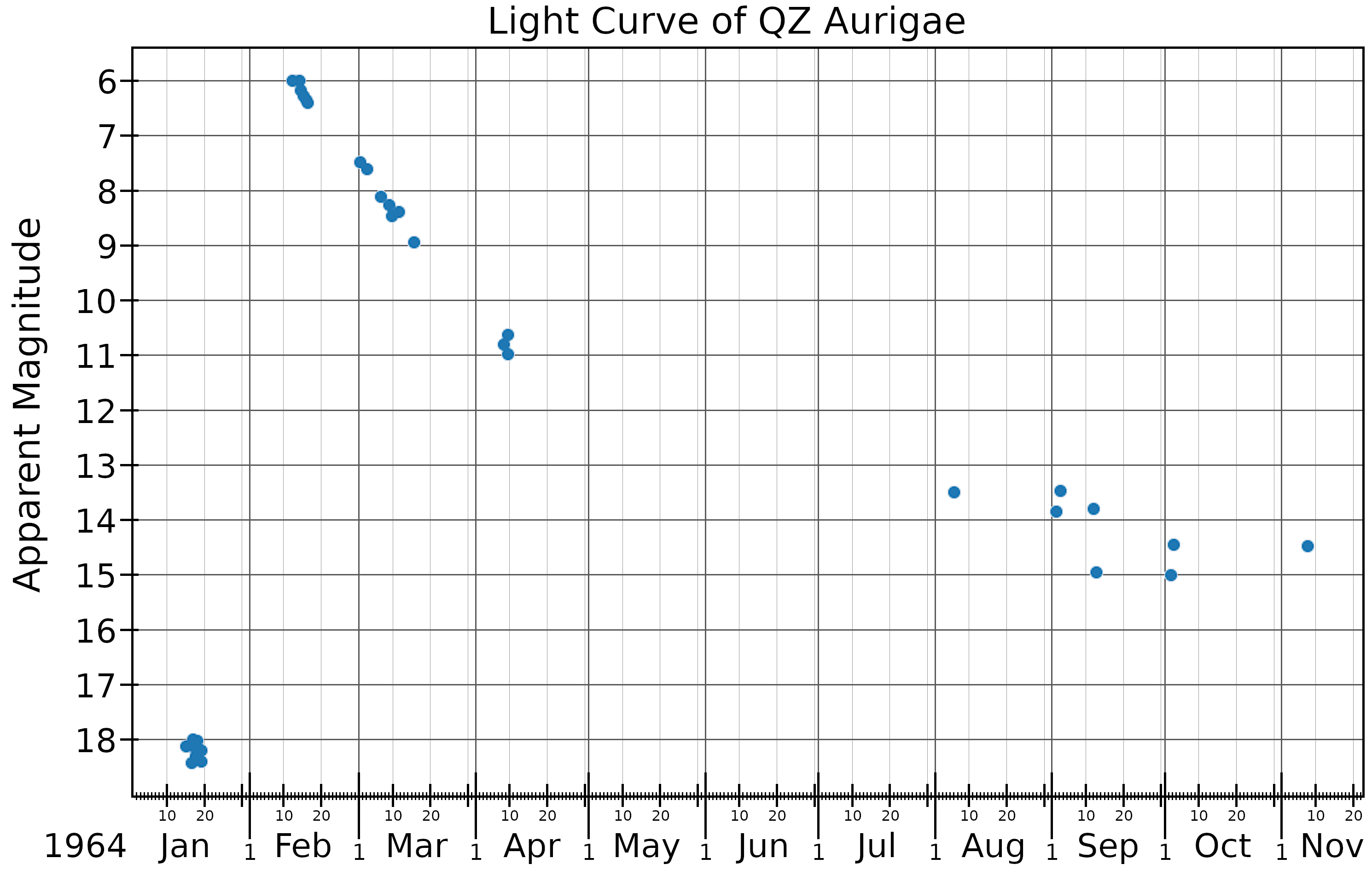
The light curve of QZ Aurigae, plotted with data from Gessner.

QZ Aurigae, also known as Nova Aurigae 1964, was a nova which occurred in the constellation Auriga during 1964. It was discovered by Nicholas Sanduleak on an objective prism photographic plate taken at the Warner and Swasey Observatory on 4 November 1964. Examination of pre-discovery plates from Sonneberg Observatory showed that the eruption occurred in early February 1964, and it had a photographic magnitude of 6.0 on 14 February 1964. Its brightness declined in images taken after the 14th, suggesting that its peak brightness was above 6.0. It was probably visible to the naked eye for a short time.

QZ Aurigae is classified as a "fast nova", because it dropped from peak brightness by three magnitudes in less than 100 days.

All novae are binary stars, with a "donor" star orbiting a white dwarf. The stars are so close to each other that matter from the donor star is transferred to an accretion disk surrounding the white dwarf. Because the separation between the stars is comparable to the radius of the donor star, novae are often eclipsing binaries, and QZ Aurigae shows such eclipses. The depth of the eclipses, 1.2 magnitudes in blue light, is unusually large, indicating that both the white dwarf and the inner accretion disk surrounding it are fully occulted at mid eclipse. The orbital period is 8.58 hours. Schaeffer used small changes in the orbital period, along with other observational data, to derive a mass of 0.98 M_{☉} for the white dwarf, and 0.93 M_{☉} for the donor star as well as a mass transfer rate of 3×10^{−8} M_{☉} per year. The donor star is a red dwarf with a spectral type of K1.
