= HD 168625 =

Star in the constellation Sagittarius

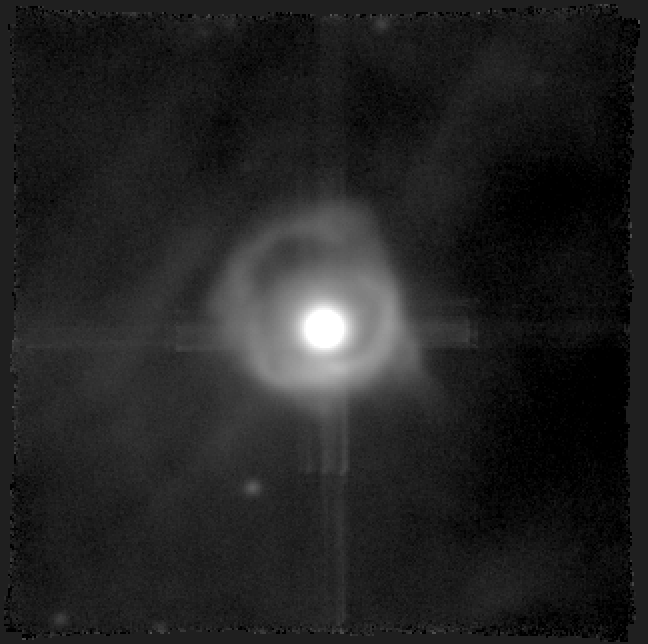
- HD 168625 and its nebula in Hydrogen-alpha with MUSE

Observation data Epoch J2000 Equinox ICRS
- Constellation: Sagittarius
- Right ascension: 18^{h} 21^{m} 19.54840^{s}
- Declination: −16° 22′ 16.0751″
- Apparent magnitude (V): 8.30–8.41

Characteristics
- Spectral type: B6Ia^{+} (B2—B8) May be B60 due to hypergiant designation
- U−B color index: +0.37
- B−V color index: +1.41
- J−K color index: 0.599
- Variable type: α Cygni

Astrometry
Radial velocity (R_{v})	−4.00 km/s
Proper motion (μ)	RA: +0.304 mas/yr Dec.: −1.978 mas/yr
Parallax (π)	0.6542±0.0259 mas
Distance	5,000 ± 200 ly (1,530 ± 60 pc)
Absolute magnitude (M_{V})	−8.39

Details
Radius	45–67 R_{☉}
Luminosity	100,000–126,000 L_{☉}
Surface gravity (log g)	1.74 cgs
Temperature	13,000–15,000 K
Rotational velocity (v sin i)	60 km/s

Other designations
- V4030 Sgr, HD 168625, BD−16°4830, SAO 161375, HIP 89963, AAVSO 1815-168

Database references
SIMBAD	data

HD 168625 (V4030 Sagittarii) is a blue hypergiant star and candidate luminous blue variable located in the constellation of Sagittarius easy to see with amateur telescopes. It forms a visual pair with the also blue hypergiant (and luminous blue variable) HD 168607 and is located to the south-east of M17, the Omega Nebula.

== Distance ==
The distance of HD 168625 and its association with the Omega Nebula and HD 168607 is debated; the Omega Nebula is generally presumed to be around 1.5–1.8 kiloparsecs (4.9–5.9 kly). A 2002 study estimates this star is farther, at about 2.8 kiloparsecs (9.1 kly) and unrelated to the other two objects. Other authors think both stars are physically associated and belong to the stellar association Serpens OB1, at a distance to the Sun of 2.2 kiloparsecs (7.2 kly). Gaia Data Release 3 estimates that both stars are at about 1.5 kiloparsecs (4.9 kly).

== Physical characteristics ==
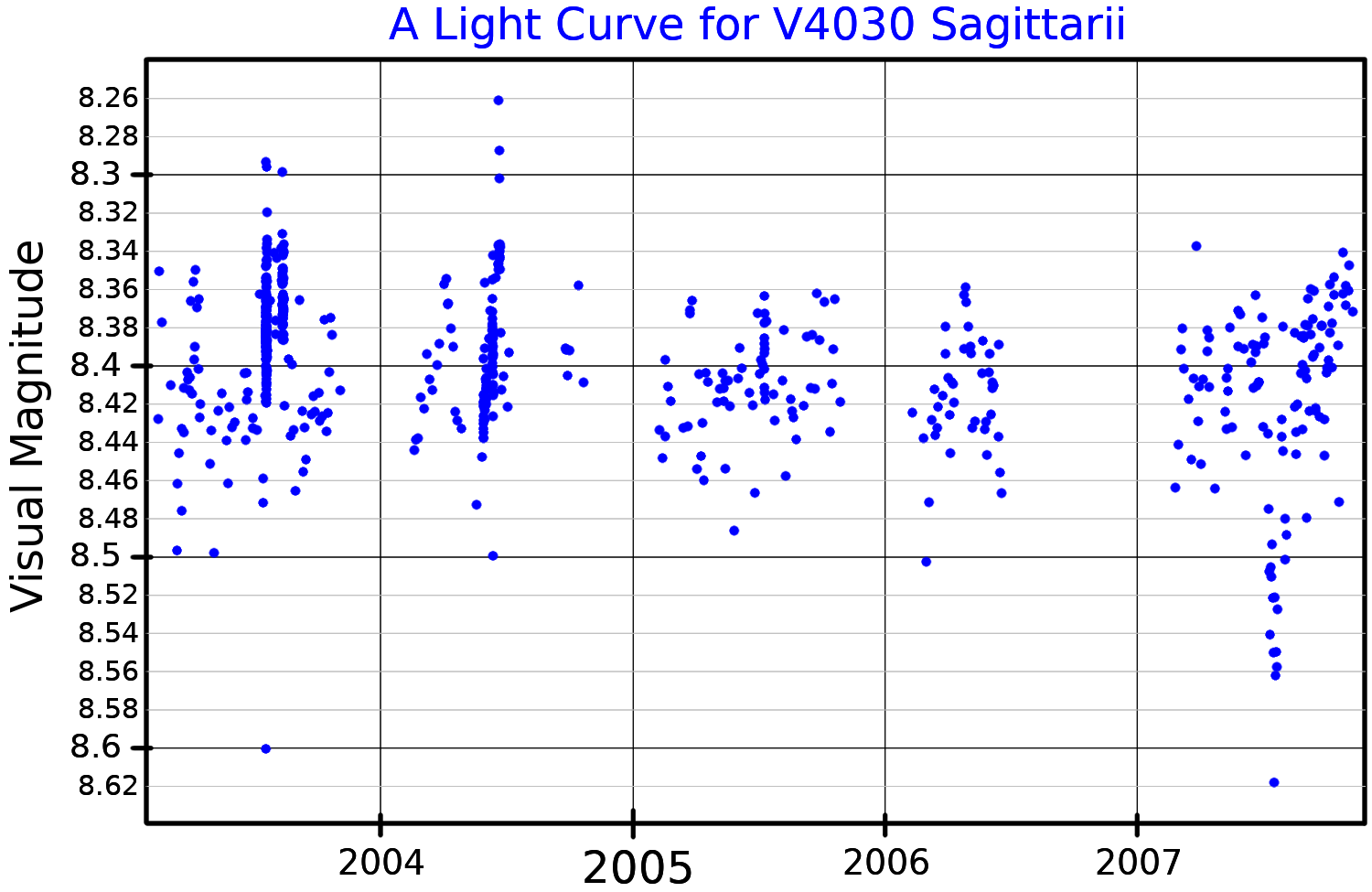
A visual band light curve for V4030 Sagittarii, plotted from ASAS data

Assuming a distance of 2.2 kiloparsecs, the star would be 220,000 times brighter than the Sun, having a surface temperature of 12,000 K. At that distance it can be calculated to be losing mass through a fierce stellar wind at roughly 1.46×10^{−6} solar masses per year however this is to be muted somewhat as work realized in 2012 from the VLT reveal a binary star system – a companion exists around 4.5 magnitudes fainter than the primary.

In 1977, Christiaan Sterken announced that HD 168625 is a variable star. It was given its variable star designation, V4030 Sagittarii, in 1979.

== Nebula ==
The most notable characteristic of HD 168625 is the presence of a nebula surrounding it that was discovered in 1994 and that has been studied with the help of several instruments and observatories and telescopes that include among others the Hubble Space Telescope and the VLT.

Said studies show that HD 168625 is actually surrounded by two nebulae: an inner one that has an elliptical shape and a very complex structure that includes arcs and filaments, and a much larger outer one discovered with the help of the Spitzer Space Telescope that has a bipolar shape and that looks like a clone of the one surrounding Sanduleak −69°202, the progenitor of the supernova 1987A in the Large Magellanic Cloud. This suggests Sanduleak −69°202 was also a luminous blue variable as well as the possibility of HD 168625 exploding as a Type II supernova in the near future.

East-north-east of this star, at about six times the angular separation of HD 168607, is HD 168701 (V4390 Sgr). It is brighter than either of the hypergiants, lies to the southeast of the nebula, and is a β Lyrae-type eclipsing binary. It is wed from the Solar System. Its parallax of 0.738±0.033 mas implies it is about 1,350 parsecs (4,400 ly) away.
