= Nicholas Sanduleak =

American astronomer

Nicholas Sanduleak (Romanian: Nicolae Sanduleac June 22, 1933 in Lackawanna, New York, United States – May 7, 1990) was an American astronomer.

== Biography ==
Sanduleak's parents were born in Romania. His family moved to Cleveland soon after he was born, where Sanduleak did undergraduate work at the Case Institute of Technology, receiving a B.S. in 1956. After serving in the Army, Sanduleak came back to Case Institute, receiving a master's degree in 1961 and a doctorate in 1965. His advisor was Dr. Victor Manuel Blanco. After working at the Kitt Peak and Cerro Tololo Observatories, Sanduleak moved to the Warner and Swasey Observatory, where he remained until his death from cardiac arrest.

== Scientific contributions ==
Sanduleak was a spectroscopist who worked on a number of very large objective prism surveys. He discovered Nova Aurigae 1964 on one of the objective prism plates. He was the first to discover metallicity differences between the Small and Large Magellanic Clouds, and wrote papers about a number of spectroscopically interesting objects. He produced a catalogue of stars in the Magellanic Clouds which included the star Sanduleak -69° 202, the progenitor of the supernova SN 1987A.

The asteroid 9403 Sanduleak is named after him.
