= NGC 3603 =

Open cluster in the constellation Carina

Molecular cloud
- Giant molecular cloud
- H II region
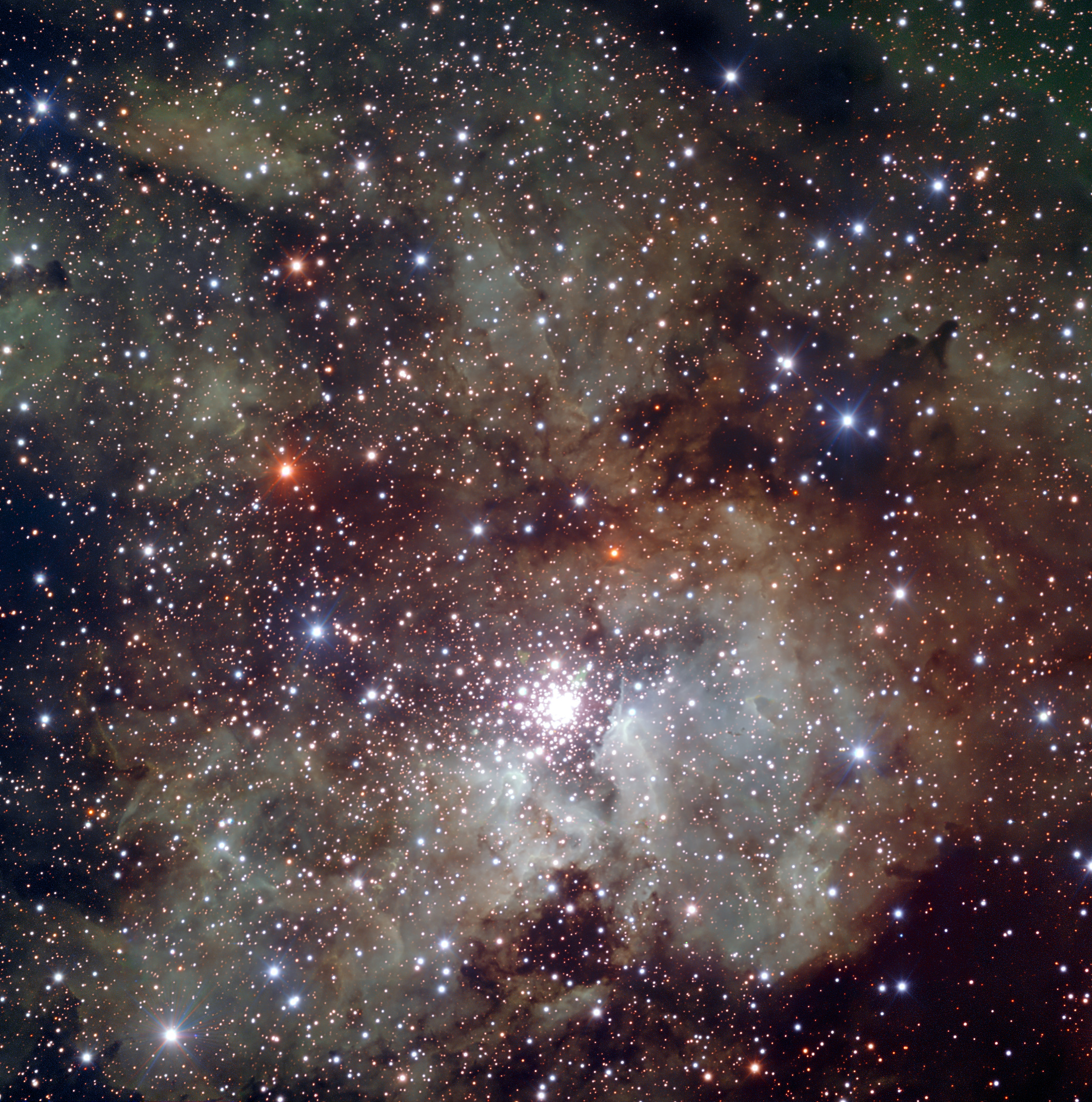
- NGC 3603 in visible and near infrared light

Observation data: J2000 epoch
- Right ascension: 11^{h} 15^{m} 23^{s}
- Declination: −61° 15′ 00″
- Distance: 6,900 pc
- Apparent magnitude (V): 9.1
- Apparent diameter: 12.0'
- Constellation: Carina
- Designations: Gum 38b, Collinder 244, RCW 57

NGC 3603 is a nebula situated in the Carina–Sagittarius Arm of the Milky Way around 20,000 light-years away from the Solar System. It is a massive H II region containing a very compact open cluster (probably a super star cluster) HD 97950.

== Observations ==
NGC 3603 (left) and NGC 3576 are star formation regions in the southern Milky Way.

NGC 3603 was observed by John Herschel on 14 March 1834 during his visit to South Africa, who remarked that it was "a very remarkable object...perhaps a globular cluster". Herschel catalogued it as nebula 3334 in his Results of Astronomical Observations made at the Cape of Good Hope, published in 1847. In 1864 the Royal Society published his General Catalogue of Nebulae and Clusters, where he listed it as number 2354. It was subsequently incorporated into the New General Catalogue as by J. L. E. Dreyer as NGC 3603.

The central cluster was catalogued as the star HD 97950, but has long been recognised as nebulous or multiple. It was also noted for having an unusual emission spectrum and the spectral type was given as Oe in the Henry Draper Catalogue. This was later refined to WN5 + O as the emission was recognised as characteristic of a Wolf–Rayet star. Eventually, the cluster would be resolved and found to contain three of the most massive and most luminous stars known, as well as a number of luminous O class stars and many fainter stars.

== Features ==
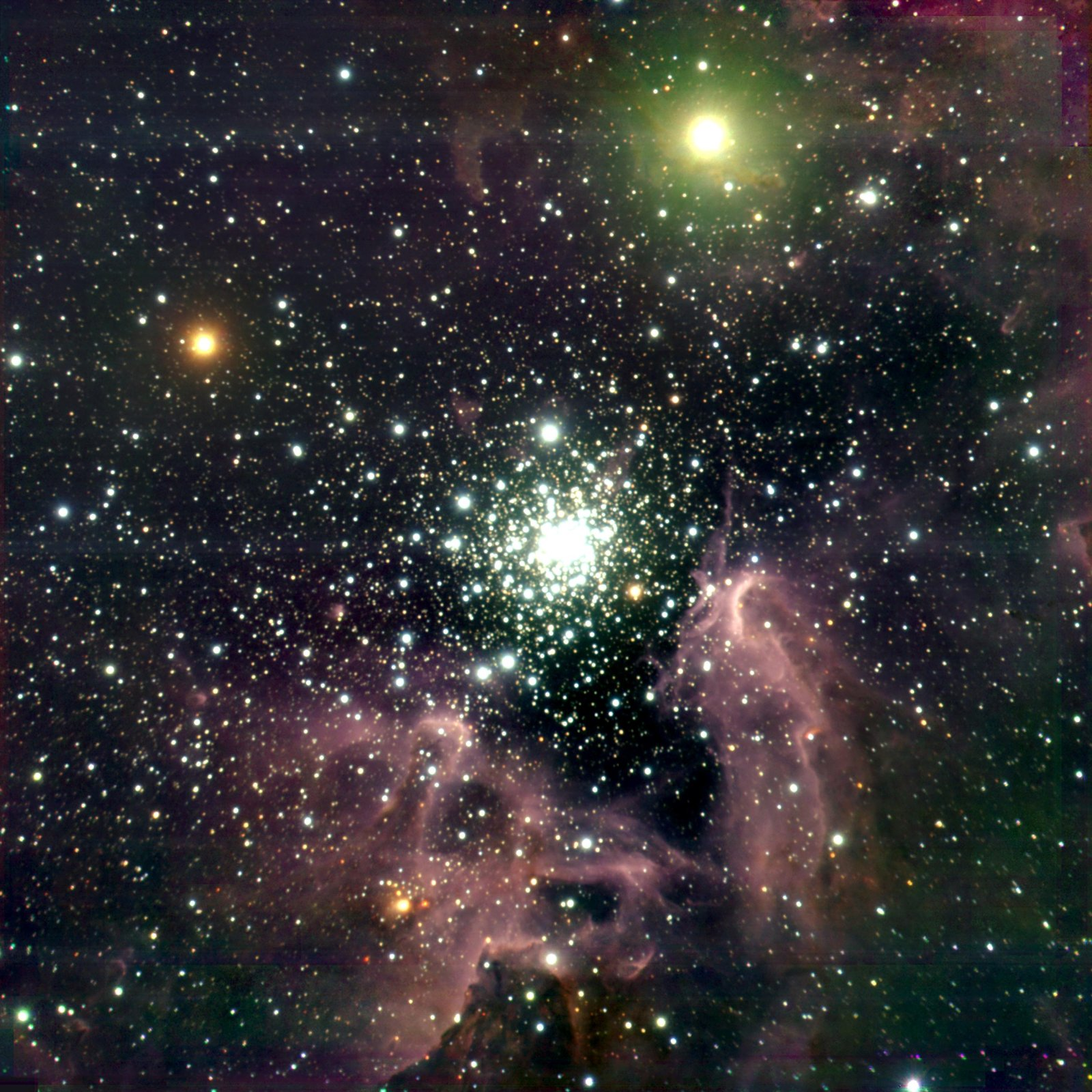
Image of the NGC 3603 region were obtained in three near-IR filter bands (Js, H and Ks) with the ISAAC instrument at the ANTU telescope

NGC 3603 is the most massive visible cloud of glowing gas and plasma, known as a H II region, in the Milky Way. The central star cluster is the densest concentration of very massive stars known in the galaxy. Strong ultraviolet radiation and stellar winds have cleared the gas and dust, giving an unobscured view of the cluster.

Three prominent Wolf–Rayet stars have been detected within the cluster, all originally unresolved and known as the single star HD 97950. The brightest of the three, HD 97950A1 (or NGC 3603-A1) is actually a pair of Wolf–Rayet stars that orbit around each other once every 3.77 days. The primary is an estimated mass 120 M_{☉}, while its companion is 92 M_{☉}. The star designated HD 97950B is a single star more massive and more luminous than either of the individual members of HD 97950A1. It is 2,880,000 times as luminous as the sun and 132 times as massive.

NGC 3603 is visible in the telescope as a small rather insignificant nebulosity with a yellowish tinge due to the effects of interstellar absorption. In the mid-1960s, optical studies combined with radio astronomical observations showed it to be an extremely strong thermal radio source. Later observations of other galaxies introduced the concept of starburst regions, in some cases whole galaxies, of extremely rapid star formation. NGC 3603 is now considered to be such a region, and it has been compared by some authors to the larger cluster 30 Doradus, in the Large Magellanic Cloud.

Sher 25, a B class supergiant, has long been thought to be a member of NGC 3603, but turns out to be a foreground star. is surrounded by ejected material in an hourglass shape similar to that found for the supernova 1987A, and this has aroused intense interest in the future evolution of stars such as Sher 25.

Two of the most luminous young stars known are found within NGC 3603, but outside the central cluster. WR 42e and NGC 3603 MTT 58 both have a spectral type of O2If*/WN6 indicating an extremely massive young star. WR 42e is a possible runaway from a three-body encounter, while MTT 58 appears to still be embedded within its parental cocoon and is in a possible binary with an O3If star.

Prominent stars
MDS number	MTT number	Other names	Spectral type	m_{V}	M_{V}	Temperature (K)	Luminosity (L_{☉})	Reference
30(A1)		WR 43a (HSW 1)	WN6h/WN6h	11.18	−7.8	42,000/40,000	2,455,000/1,514,000	
31(A2)		HSW 4	O3V	12.53	−6.9	46,500	1,500,000	
26(A3)		HSW 5	O3III	13.09	−6.4	46,500	863,000	
23(B)		WR 43b (HSW 2)	WN6h	11.33	−7.9	42,000	2,884,000	
18(C)		WR 43c (HSW 3)	WN6h	11.89	−7.3	44,000	2,239,000	
49(D1)			O4V	12.64	−6.3	44,000		
50(D2)			O5V	12.74	−6.2	41,000		
52(D3)			O4V	13.68	−5.2	44,000		
19(E)		MMM 104	O5.5III(f)	12.83	−6.1	41,000	1,038,000	
39(F)	6		O5V	11.86	−6.1	41,000		
61(G)	10		O5V	12.74	−6	41,000		
	58	WR 43-2	O2If*/WN6	14.76	−5.7		855,000	
		WR 42e	O2If*/WN6	14.53	−6.3		3‚200,000	
29			O4V	13.68	−5.2	44,000		
27			O4V	13.07	−5.8	44,000		
25			O4V	13.01	−5.9	44,000		
40			O3V	13.33	−5.7	46,500	718,000	
33			O5V+OB?	13.69	−5.8			
41			O4V	14.24	−5.1	44,000	217,000	
42			O3III	12.99	−6.1	46,500	946,000	
37			O6.5V+?	14.16	−5			
38			O3V	13.21	−5.9	46,500	497,000	
16			O3V	13.53	−5.4	46,500	655,000	
43		MMM 111	O4V	13.87	−5	44,000		
14			O4V	13.88	−5	44,000		
59			O4V	13.65	−5.3	44,000		
60			O4V	13.6	−5.3	44,000		
62			O4V	13.09	−5.6	44,000		
58		MMM 101	O6.5V((f))	14.02	−5.1	37,000	238,000	
51	23	Sher 56	O4V(f)	13.33	−5.6	44,000		
9		MMM 108	O5.5V	13.71	−5.5	39,500	377,000	
7	26	Sher 64	O4V	13.58	−5.4	44,000	863,000	
22	17	Sher 57	O5III(f)	13.23	−5.8	41,000	787,000	
1	12	Sher 23	OC9.7Ia	12.7	−6.3	30,250	413,000	
2	18	Sher 22	O3III(f)	13.21	−5.6	46,500	863,000	
48	14	Sher 18	O3.5If	12.65	−6.4	39,500	1,644,000	
24	11	Sher 47	O4V	12.72	−6.2	44,000	1,644,000	
20			O4V	13.98		44,000		
76	39	Sher 54	O6V	14.57	−4.6	38,300	150,000	
17		MMM 116	O4V	14.1		44,000		
36			O6V	14.52	−4.2	38,300	114,000	
45			O8V-III	14.14	−4.7	33,700	114,000	
4	41	Sher 49	O7.5V	14.67	−4.6	34,800	114,000	
57			O4V	13.98		44,000		
10		MMM 117	O6V	14.17	−5.1	38,300	238,000	
3	32	Sher 24	O6V	14.27	−5	38,300	217,000	
	51	Sher 27	O7.5V	15.04	−4	34,800	65,000	
	15	Sher 63	O3.5III(f)	13.41	−5.6	45,000	597,000	
63	40	Sher 53	O8.5V	14.47	−4.8	32,700	125,000	
73		MMM 102	O8.5V	15.32	−3.9	32,700	50,000	
	47	Sher 21	O6V((f))	14.75	−4.6	38,300	150,000	
	25	Sher 19	O3V	12.61	−6.2	46,500	497,000	
		MMM 103	O3V((f))	13.09	−5.7	46,500	718,000	
		MMM 109	O7V	13.85	−4.9	36,000	180,000	
