= Sher 25 =

Star in the constellation Carina

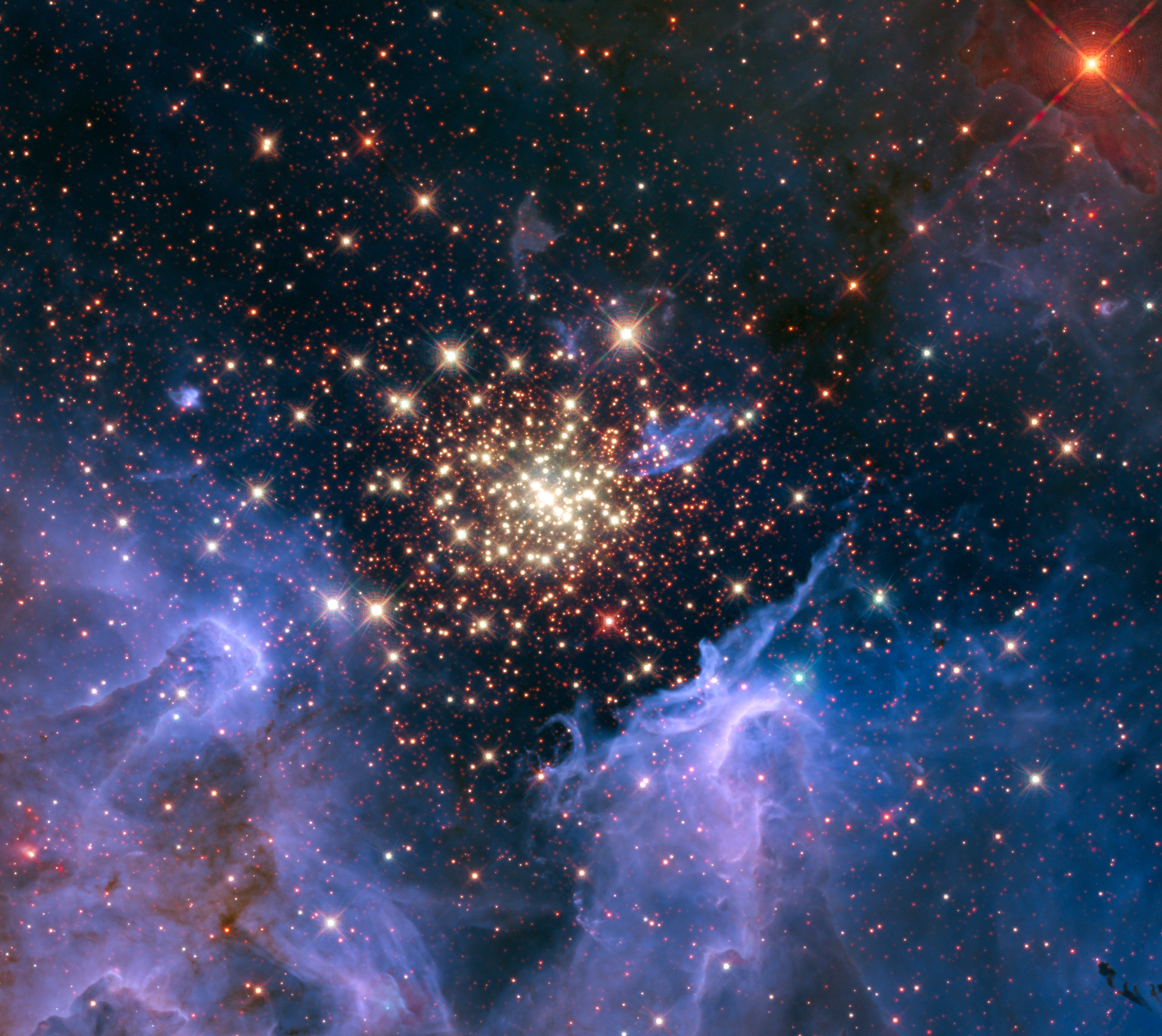
- HST image of NGC 3603 with Sher 25 surrounded by a faint ring of nebulosity, above and slightly to the right of the main core of the cluster

Observation data Epoch J2000.0 Equinox ICRS
- Constellation: Carina
- Right ascension: 11^{h} 15^{m} 7.645^{s}
- Declination: −61° 15′ 17.61″
- Apparent magnitude (V): 12.23

Characteristics
- Evolutionary stage: Blue supergiant
- Spectral type: B1Iab
- U−B color index: 0.13
- B−V color index: 1.42
- Variable type: cLBV

Astrometry
Proper motion (μ)	RA: −5.387 mas/yr Dec.: +2.116 mas/yr
Parallax (π)	0.1560±0.0166 mas
Distance	17,700±2,300 ly (5,440±700 pc)
Absolute magnitude (M_{V})	−7.05±0.34

Details
Mass	25.5±1.7 M_{☉}
Radius	42±7 R_{☉}
Luminosity (bolometric)	308,000+115,000 −83,000 L_{☉}
Surface gravity (log g)	2.61±0.06 cgs
Temperature	20,900±500 K
Rotational velocity (v sin i)	60±5 km/s
Age	7.24+0.70 −0.64 Myr

Other designations
- Sher 25, NGC 3603-25, NGC 3603 MTT 13, NGC 3603 MDS 5

Database references
SIMBAD	data

Sher 25 is a blue supergiant star in the constellation Carina. It is a spectral type B1Iab star with an apparent magnitude of 12.2. The star lies close to the H II region NGC 3603 of the Milky Way, but is a foreground star. Its initial main sequence mass is calculated at 60 times the mass of the Sun, but a star of this type will have already lost a substantial fraction of that mass. It is unclear whether Sher 25 has been through a red supergiant phase or has just evolved from the main sequence, so the current mass is very uncertain.

The name derives from the original cataloguing of stars in NGC 3603 by David Sher. This catalogue entry is more fully referred to as NGC 3603 Sher 25 to distinguish it from stars potentially numbered 25 by Sher in other clusters (eg. NGC 3766). The same star was numbered 13 by Melnick, Tapia, and Terlevich (MTT 13) and 5 in a Hubble Space Telescope survey by Moffat, Drissen, and Shara (NGC 3603 MDS 5).

Sher 25 has long being thought to be a member of NGC 3603, but calculations based on spectroscopy give a closer distance: 5,440 pc (17,700 ly) versus 6,250 pc (20,400 ly) for NGC 3603. Furthermore, its hourglass-shaped nebula does not seem to be affected by the stellar winds of OB stars in the cluster, ruling out membership to NGC 3603.

It is speculated that Sher 25 is near the point of exploding as a supernova, as it has recently thrown off matter in a pattern similar to that of supernova 1987A in the Large Magellanic Cloud, with a circumstellar ring and bipolar outflow filaments.

Regular variations in the doppler shift of the star's spectral lines with a period of a few days may be due to orbital motion about a companion star, or to pulsations of the star's surface.
