= NGC 3603-B =

Wolf-Rayet star in the constellation Carina

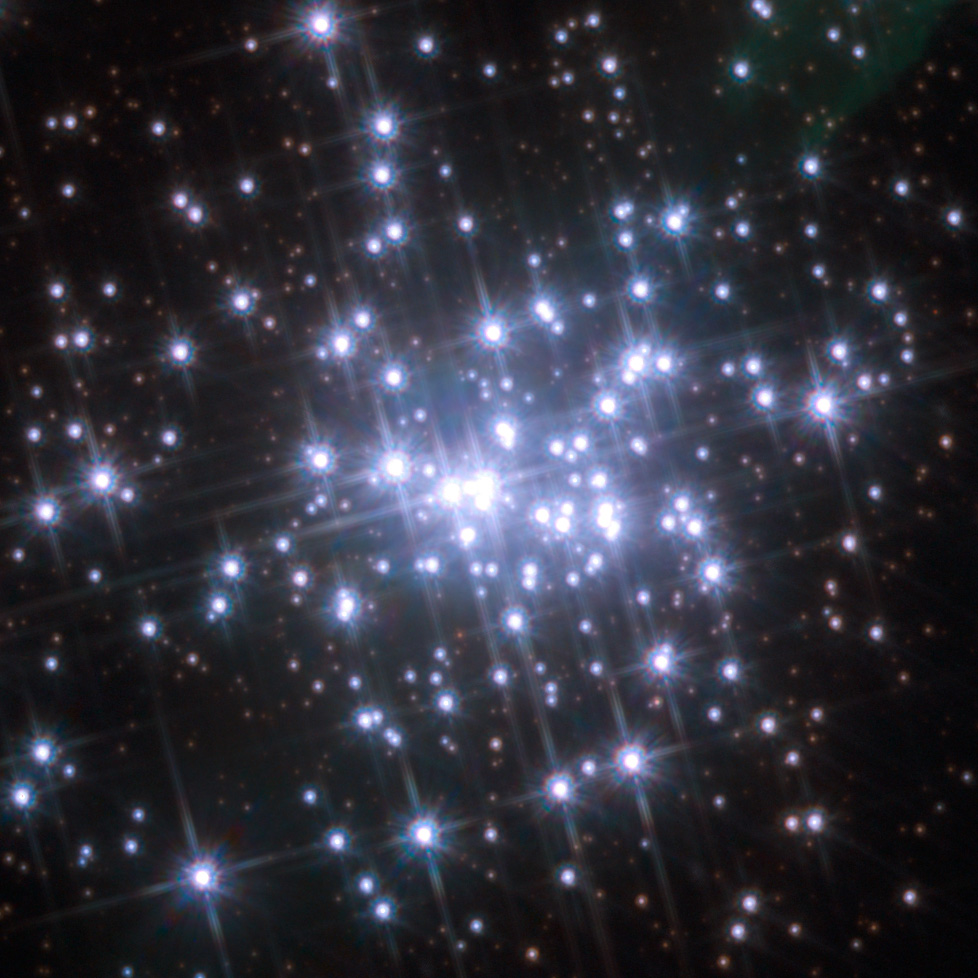
- B is the brightest star just left of the three barely-resolved A components at the centre in this HST image of the central region of HD 97950. Credit: NASA, ESA and Wolfgang Brandner (MPIA), Boyke Rochau (MPIA) and Andrea Stolte (University of Cologne)

Observation data Epoch J2000.0 Equinox J2000.0 (ICRS)
- Constellation: Carina
- Right ascension: 11^{h} 15^{m} 07.411^{s}
- Declination: −61° 15′ 38.58″
- Apparent magnitude (V): 11.33

Characteristics
- Evolutionary stage: main sequence
- Spectral type: WN6h
- B−V color index: +1.01

Astrometry
Proper motion (μ)	RA: +2.4 mas/yr Dec.: +2.8 mas/yr
Distance	7,600 pc
Absolute magnitude (M_{V})	−7.77

Details
Mass	132 M_{☉}
Radius	33.8 R_{☉}
Luminosity	2,900,000 L_{☉}
Temperature	42,000 K
Age	1.5 Myr

Other designations
- NGC 3603-B, CD−60°3452B, CPD−60°2732B, HD 97950B, HIP 54948B, WR 43b, NGC 3603 MDS 23

Database references
SIMBAD	data

NGC 3603-B (HD 97950B) is a Wolf-Rayet star located at the centre of the HD 97950 cluster in the NGC 3603 star-forming region, about 25,000 light years from Earth. It has the spectral type WN6h and is among the most luminous and most massive stars known.

HD 97950 was catalogued as a star, but was known to be a dense cluster or close multiple star. In 1926, the six brightest members were given letters from A to F, although several of them have since been resolved into more than one star. Star B turned out to be the brightest single star.

HD 97950B is a Wolf-Rayet (WR) star, with spectra dominated by strong broadened emission lines. Type WN6 indicates that ionised nitrogen lines are strong in comparison to ionised carbon lines, and the suffix h indicates that hydrogen is also seen in the spectrum. This type of WR star is not the classical stripped helium-burning aged star, but a young highly luminous object with CNO cycle fusion products showing at the surface due to strong conventional and rotational mixing, and high mass loss rates from the atmosphere. The emission lines are generated in the stellar wind and the photosphere is completely hidden. The surface fraction of hydrogen is still estimated to be around 60%.

HD 97950B is the most massive and most luminous star known in the NGC 3603 region, nearly three million times more luminous than the sun and 132 times more massive. Although the star is very young, around 1.5 million years old, it has already lost a considerable fraction of its initial masses. The initial mass is estimated to have been 166 solar masses, meaning it has lost 34 solar masses.
