= NGC 3603-A1 =

Double-eclipsing binary star system in the constellation Carina

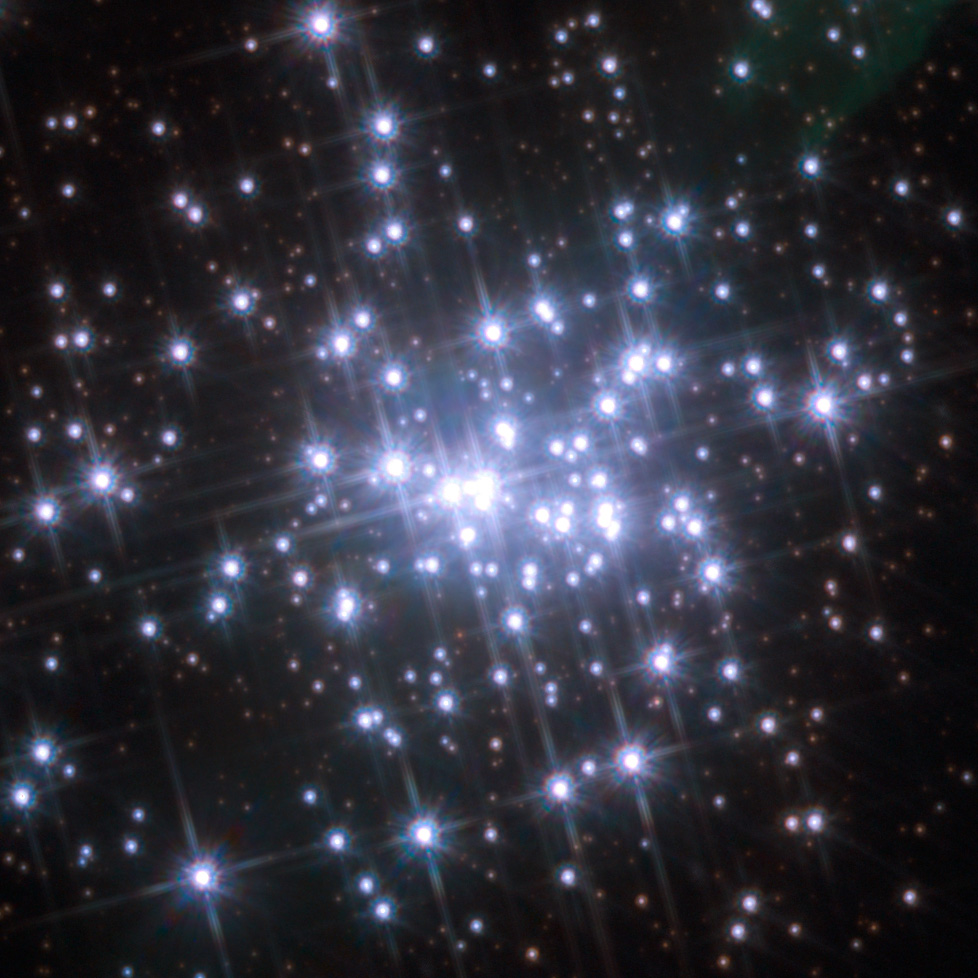
- A1 is the brightest (and top right) of the three barely-resolved stars at the centre in this HST image of the central region of HD 97950. Credit: NASA, ESA and Wolfgang Brandner (MPIA), Boyke Rochau (MPIA) and Andrea Stolte (University of Cologne)

Observation data Epoch J2000.0 Equinox J2000.0 (ICRS)
- Constellation: Carina
- Right ascension: 11^{h} 15^{m} 07.305^{s}
- Declination: −61° 15′ 38.43″
- Apparent magnitude (V): 11.18

Characteristics
- Evolutionary stage: main sequence
- Spectral type: WN6h+WN6h
- B−V color index: 1.03
- Variable type: EA

Astrometry
Radial velocity (R_{v})	−24.9±13.3 km/s
Proper motion (μ)	RA: +2.4 mas/yr Dec.: +2.8 mas/yr
Distance	7,600 pc
Absolute magnitude (M_{V})	−7.3

Orbit
Primary	A1a
Companion	A1b
Period (P)	3.772980±00005 days
Eccentricity (e)	0 (fixed)
Inclination (i)	73.5±2.5°
Semi-amplitude (K_{1}) (primary)	307.9±19.6 km/s
Semi-amplitude (K_{2}) (secondary)	408.2±19.6 km/s

Details

A1a
Mass	93.3±11.0 M_{☉}
Radius	22.6 R_{☉}
Luminosity	2,500,000 L_{☉}
Temperature	37,000 K
Rotational velocity (v sin i)	290±40 km/s
Age	1.5 Myr

A1b
Mass	70.4±9.3 M_{☉}
Radius	18.4 R_{☉}
Luminosity	1,500,000 L_{☉}
Temperature	42,000 K
Rotational velocity (v sin i)	520±45 km/s
Age	1.5 Myr

Other designations
- NGC 3603-A1, CD−60°3452A1, CPD−60°2732A1, HD 97950A1, HIP 54948A1, WR 43a, UCAC2 4794917, AAVSO 1110-60, NGC 3603 MDS 30

Database references
SIMBAD	data

NGC 3603-A1 (HD 97950A1) is a double-eclipsing binary star system located at the centre of the HD 97950 cluster in the NGC 3603 star-forming region, about 25,000 light years from Earth. Both stars are of spectral type WN6h and among the most luminous and most massive known.

HD 97950 was catalogued as a star, but was known to be a dense cluster or close multiple star. In 1926, the six brightest members were given letters from A to F, although several of them have since been resolved into more than one star. Star A was first resolved into three components using speckle interferometry, although they can now be directly imaged using space-based or adaptive optics. Component A1 was finally determined to be a spectroscopic binary.

== Observations ==
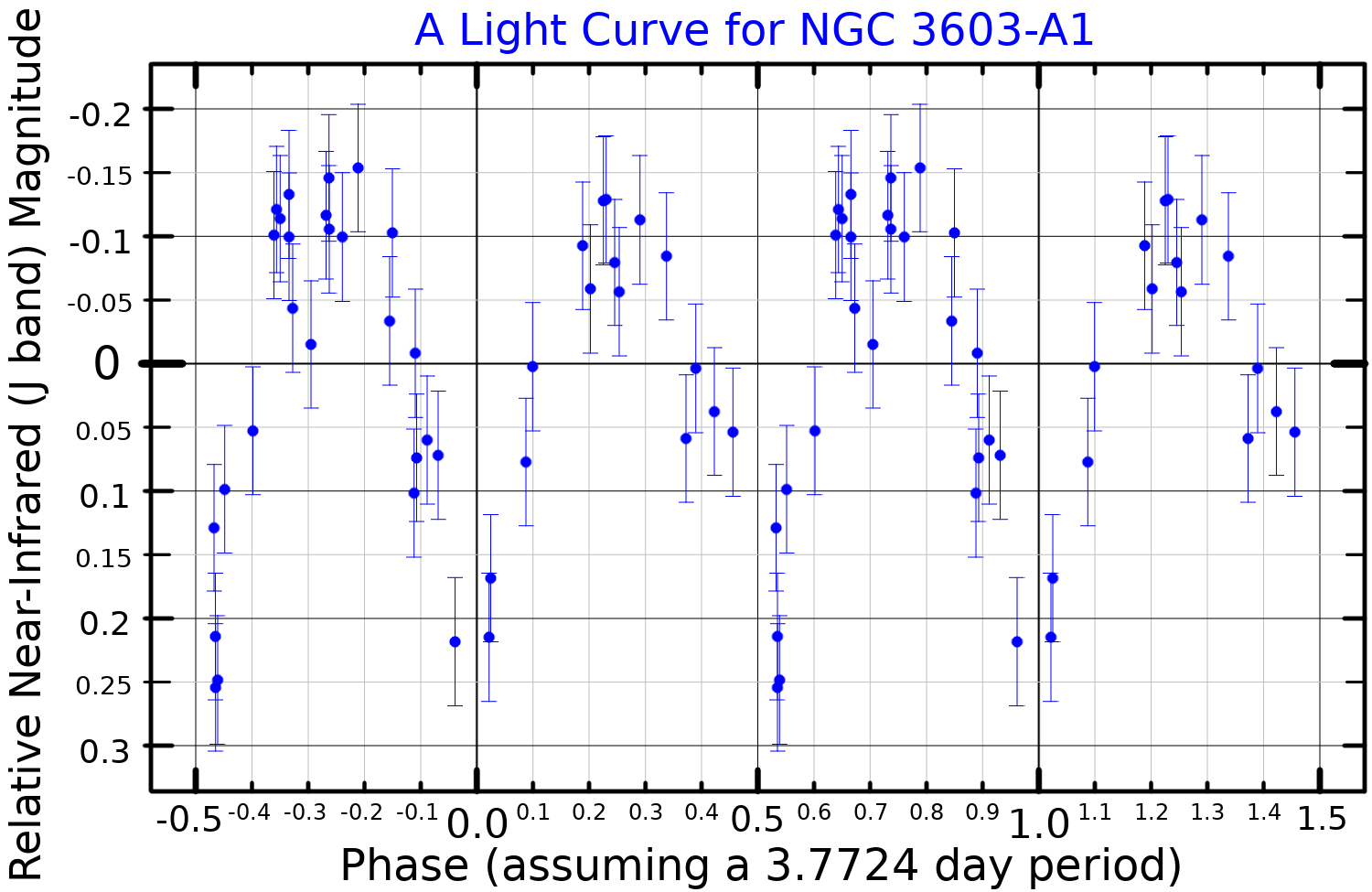
A near-infrared (J band) light curve for NGC 3603-A1, adapted from Moffat et al. (2004)

The two component stars of NGC 3603-A1 circle each other every 3.77 days, and show brightness variations of about 0.3 magnitudes due to eclipses. The stars orbit very close to each other, separated by barely their own diameters and at or near to filling their Roche lobes.

The masses of A1a and A1b determined from the orbital parameters are 93.3±11.0 M_{☉} and 70.4±9.3 M_{☉}respectively. The sum of masses is the highest among binary systems in the Milky Way with directly measured masses (i.e. masses measured by the binary's orbit). The masses estimated from analysis of the physical properties are slightly higher at 120 M_{☉} and 92 M_{☉}.

Each component is a Wolf-Rayet (WR) star, with spectra dominated by strong broadened emission lines. Type WN6 indicates that ionised nitrogen lines are strong in comparison to ionised carbon lines, and the suffix h indicates that hydrogen is also seen in the spectrum. This type of WR star is not the classical stripped helium-burning aged star, but a young highly luminous object with CNO cycle fusion products showing at the surface due to strong conventional and rotational mixing, and high mass loss rates from the atmosphere. The emission lines are generated in the stellar wind and the photosphere is completely hidden. The surface fraction of hydrogen is still estimated to be 60-70%.

Although the stars are very young, around 1.5 million years old, they have already lost a considerable fraction of their initial masses. The initial masses are estimated to have been 148 M_{☉} and 106 M_{☉}, meaning they have lost 28 M_{☉} and 14 M_{☉} respectively.
