= DR1 (star) =

Wolf-Rayet star in the galaxy IC 1613

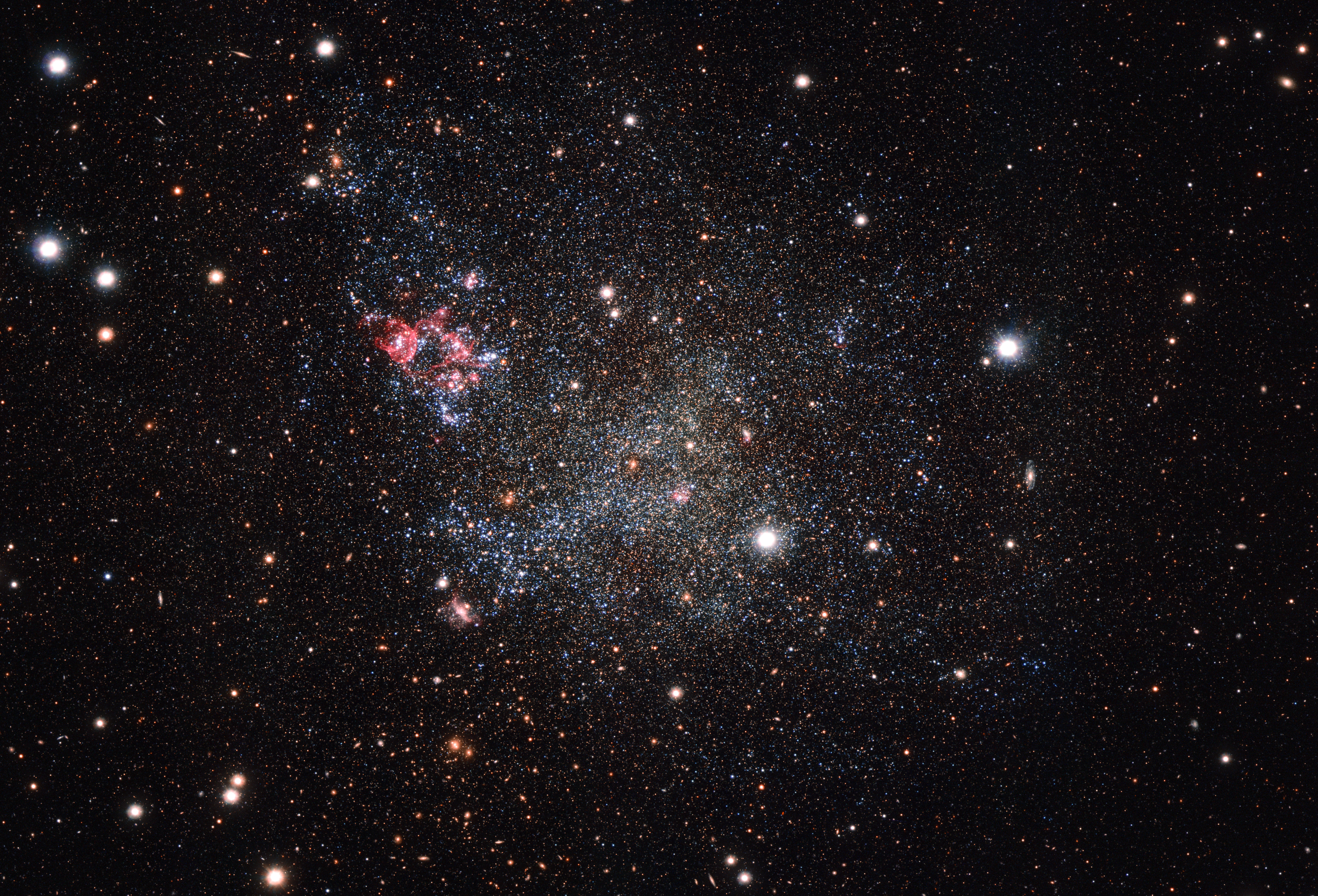
- Location of DR1 (circled in yellow), as captured by the VLT's OmegaCAM.

Observation data Epoch J2000.0 Equinox ICRS
- Constellation: Cetus
- Right ascension: 01^{h} 05^{m} 01.61780^{s}
- Declination: +02° 04′ 19.9382″
- Apparent magnitude (V): 19.857

Characteristics
- Evolutionary stage: Wolf-Rayet
- Spectral type: WO3

Astrometry
Radial velocity (R_{v})	−226±18 km/s
Proper motion (μ)	RA: +0.430 mas/yr Dec.: +0.328 mas/yr
Distance	721,000 pc
Absolute magnitude (M_{V})	−4.43

Details
Mass	20 M_{☉}
Radius	1.06 R_{☉}
Luminosity	479,000 L_{☉}
Temperature	150,000 K
Metallicity	15% solar
Rotational velocity (v sin i)	≤500 km/s

Other designations
- DR 1 in IC 1613, IC 1613 WR, B 17, CAIRNS J010501.61+020420.6, IC 1613 6, Gaia DR3 2539058702595056640

Database references
SIMBAD	data

DR1 is a solitary Wolf-Rayet (WR) star in the irregular dwarf galaxy IC 1613, located approximately 721 kiloparsecs (2,350,000 light-years) away in the constellation of Cetus. An extremely rare star on the WO oxygen sequence, it may be the only Wolf-Rayet star in IC 1613.

== Discovery ==
In 1982, a spectrum was obtained of one of the H II regions within IC 1613 named S3, as a comparison object for observing a supernova remnant within the same galaxy. The spectrum displayed broad emission lines at wavelengths of 4650 and 5810 Å, indicative of the presence of either a singular WC star with peculiar emission features or a WC+WN binary. Also in 1982, Davidson & Kinman suggested that it was rather an WO star due to the presence of Ovi (O^{5+}) lines. A 1991 paper gave it a tentative WO4 spectral type, which was revised to WO3 in 1993. In 1985, it was listed as a WR candidate alongside seven other objects in IC 1613, but all but DR1 turned out not to be WR stars. As of 2019, it remains the only confirmed WR star in the galaxy, though in 2021, a candidate dust-producing WC star designated SPIRITS14bqe was found, which may resemble the WC5+O9 binary system WR 19.

== Features ==
DR1, of stellar classification WO3, is one of the hottest stars discovered with an effective temperature of 150,000 K. As a consequence, it is very luminous, radiating 479,000 times the luminosity of the Sun. It is a very dense star, weighing 20 M_{☉} despite only being 6% larger than the Sun in radius. The star has the lowest metallicity known for a WO star at just 15% the solar value. Intense stellar winds, with a terminal velocity of 2,750 km/s, are causing DR1 to lose mass at a rate of 1.8×10^{−5} M_{☉}/yr. This is several hundred million times faster than the Sun's, which is at (2–3)×10^{−14} M_{☉} per year.

=== S3 nebula ===
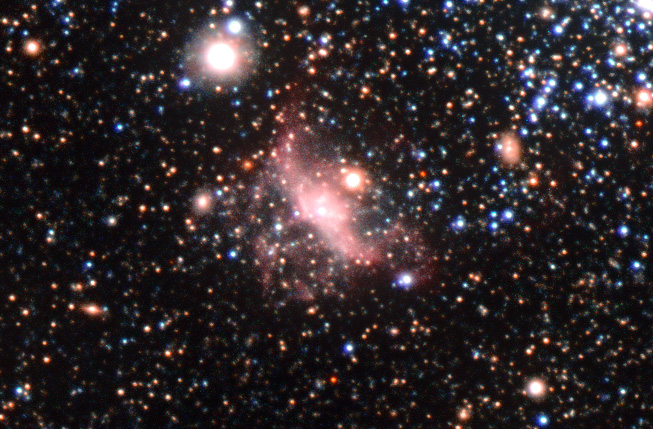
Image of S3 nebula containing DR1 star

The brightest HII region in IC 1613, S3 was first catalogued by Allan Sandage in 1971. It is approximately 108 pc by 33 pc and is thought to be ionised solely by DR1. With an electron temperature of 17,100 K, it is among the hottest HII regions in the Local Group. Unusually for HII regions, it displays nebular Heii (He^{+}) lines at 4686 Å. It has a bipolar structure, similar in appearance to the planetary nebula NGC 2346, with two lobes that stretch northwest and southeast, the northwest one being larger. Two superbubbles, named R16 and R17, have been detected in the vicinity of the northwestern lobe, which could be ionised by DR1. The WO star is nestled in its bright central region, thus it is probable that the nebula was formed by DR1 while it was still a main-sequence star. A shell of neutral gas has been discovered surrounding S3, which is also likely to have been ejected from DR1 during its main-sequence phase.

== Evolutionary status ==
WO stars are the last evolutionary stage of the most massive stars. From its position in the Hertzsprung–Russell diagram, DR1 is inferred to have started its life as a 120 M_{☉} star, which has now lost most of its mass and is at its last stages of stellar nucleosynthesis, near the end of helium burning. Stars with a final mass above 10 M_{☉}, such as DR1, are expected to form black holes, producing a faint supernova or no supernova at all. However, if the star is rapidly rotating like the galactic WO stars WR 102 and WR 142 analyzed by Sander et al. (2012), it may instead produce a bright type Ib/c supernova perhaps accompanied by a gamma-ray burst. The latter scenario is more likely at lower metallicities as seen in DR1. The supernova is estimated to occur within 17,000 years.

== See also ==
- Other extragalactic WO stars:
  - AB8 (star)
  - BAT99-123
  - LH 41-1042
  - LMC195-1
- List of supernova candidates
