= List of supernova candidates =

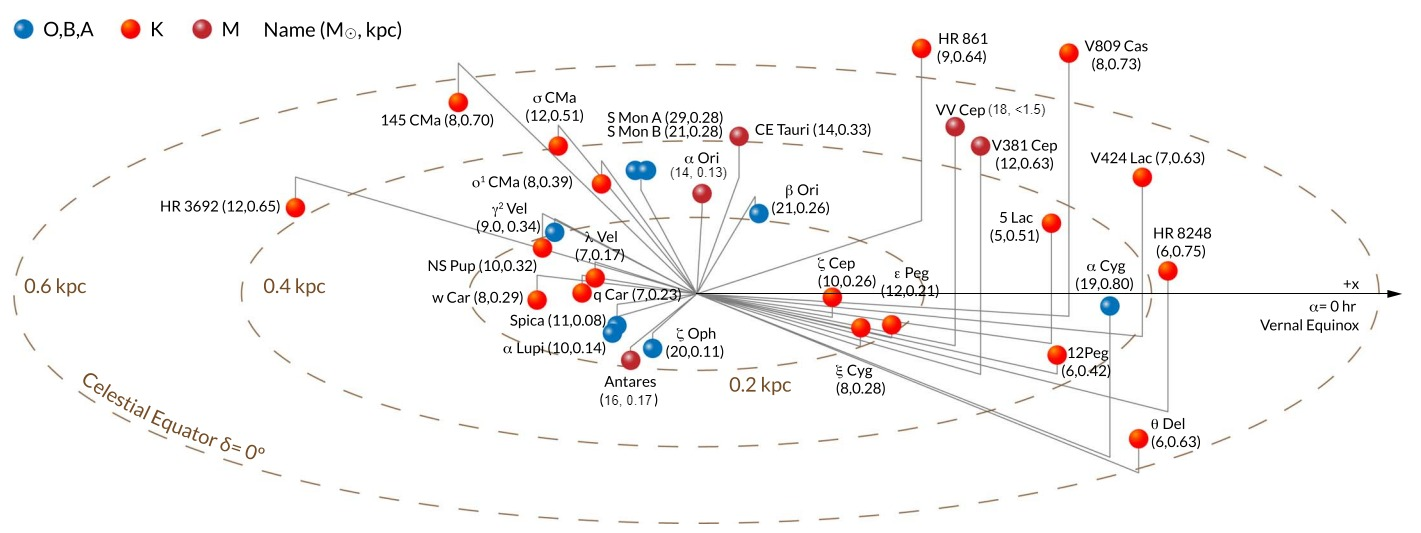
Map showing various supernova candidates, most of which are within one kiloparsec from the Solar System

This is a list of supernova candidates, or stars that are believed to soon become supernovae. Type II supernova progenitors include stars with at least 8–10 solar masses that are in the final stages of their evolution. Prominent examples of stars in this mass range include Antares, Spica, Gamma Velorum, Mu Cephei, and members of the Quintuplet Cluster. Type Ia supernova progenitors are white dwarf stars that are close to the Chandrasekhar limit of about 1.44 solar masses and are accreting matter from a binary companion star.

The list includes massive Wolf–Rayet stars, which may become Type Ib/Ic supernovae, particularly oxygen-sequence (Wolf–Rayet WO) stars. As of 2023, most of these candidates are in the Milky Way galaxy; however, five oxygen-sequence Wolf–Rayet stars are also known in other galaxies.

== Table ==
Identifier	Epoch J2000		Constellation	Distance (light-years)	Spectral class	Evolutionary stage	Possible supernova type	Notes
Identifier	R. A.	Dec.	Constellation	Distance (light-years)	Spectral class	Evolutionary stage	Possible supernova type	Notes
Wolf 1130	20^{h} 05^{m} 19.5^{s}	+54° 26′ 03″	Cygnus	54.09 ± 0.02	M3 + D	Subdwarf + white dwarf	Ia	Supernova will occur in over 6.2 billion years.
49 Librae	16^{h} 00^{m} 19.61^{s}	−16° 32′ 00.5″	Libra	95.3 ± 0.5	F8V + D	Main sequence + white dwarf	Ia	Supernova will occur in over 500 million years after binary pair merger.
NLTT 12758	04^{h} 12^{m} 26.33^{s}	−11° 17′ 47.3″	Eridanus	114.5 ± 0.1	D + D	White dwarf + white dwarf	Ia	Supernova will occur in 140 billion years
IK Pegasi	21^{h} 26^{m} 26.7^{s}	+19° 22′ 32″	Pegasus	154 ± 1	A8m: or kA6hA9mF0 + DA	Main sequence + White dwarf	Ia	Supernova will occur in 1.9 billion years
WD J181058.67+311940.94	18^{h} 10^{m} 58.7^{s}	+31° 19′ 40.9″	Hercules	160	D + D	White dwarf + white dwarf	Ia	Supernova will occur in 23 billion years
Sigma Sagittarii (Nunki)	18^{h} 55^{m} 15.93^{s}	–26° 17′ 48.2″	Sagittarius	224.7 ± 9.8	B2.5 V	Main sequence	II	Supernova will occur in over 20 million years after binary pair merger.
Bellatrix	05^{h} 25^{m} 07.86^{s}	+06° 20′ 58.9″	Orion	250 ± 10	B2 III or B2V	Blue giant	II	
Spica	13^{h} 25^{m} 11.6^{s}	−11° 09′ 40.8″	Virgo	250 ± 10	B1III-IV	Subgiant	II	
Mimosa	12^{h} 47^{m} 43.26877^{s}	−59° 41′ 19.5792″	Crux	280 ± 20	B0.5 III	Blue giant	II	
Eta Centauri	14^{h} 35^{m} 30.42416^{s}	−42° 09′ 28.1708″	Centaurus	306 ± 6	B1.5 Vne	Main-sequence	II	
Acrux Aa	12^{h} 26^{m} 35.9^{s}	–63° 05′ 56″	Crux	348 ± 5	B0.5 IV	Main sequence	II	
Acrux B	12^{h} 26^{m} 36.4^{s}	–63° 05′ 58″	Crux	348 ± 5	B1 V	Main sequence	II	
Beta Centauri Aa (Hadar)	14^{h} 03^{m} 49.40535^{s}	−60° 22′ 22.9266″	Centaurus	361 ± 2	B1 III	Blue giant	II	
Beta Centauri Ab (Hadar)	14^{h} 03^{m} 49.40535^{s}	−60° 22′ 22.9266″	Centaurus	361 ± 2	B1 III	Blue giant	II	
Epsilon Canis Majoris (Adhara)	06^{h} 58^{m} 37.54876^{s}	−28° 58′ 19.5102″	Canis Major	405 ± 7	B2 II or B2 III-II	Bright giant or Subgiant	II	
Betelgeuse	05^{h} 55^{m} 10.3^{s}	+07° 24′ 25″	Orion	408 – 548+90 −49	M1–M2 Ia–ab	Red supergiant	II-P	
Zeta Ophiuchi	16^{h} 37^{m} 09.5^{s}	−10° 34′ 02″	Ophiuchus	440 ± 36	O9.5V	Main sequence	II	
Beta Scorpii Aa (Acrab)	16^{h} 05^{m} 26.23198^{s}	−19° 48′ 19.6300″	Scorpius	400 ± 40	B0.5IV-V	Main-sequence	II	
Alpha Lupi (Uridim)	14^{h} 41^{m} 55.8^{s}	–47° 23′ 17″	Lupus	460 ± 10	B1.5 III	Blue giant	II	
Kappa Scorpii	17^{h} 42^{m} 29.27520^{s}	−39° 01′ 47.9391″	Scorpius	480 ± 10	B1.5 III	Blue giant	II	
Delta Scorpii A (Dschubba)	16^{h} 00^{m} 20.00528^{s}	−22° 37′ 18.1431″	Scorpius	490	B0.3 IV	Main-sequence	II	
Beta Canis Majoris (Mirzam)	06^{h} 22^{m} 41.98535^{s}	−17° 57′ 21.3073″	Canis Major	490 ± 20	B1 II-III	Blue giant	II	
Antares	16^{h} 29^{m} 24.5^{s}	–26° 25′ 55″	Scorpius	550	M1.5Iab-b	Red supergiant	II-P	
Gamma Cassiopeiae (Tiansi)	00^{h} 56^{m} 42.50108^{s}	+60° 43′ 00.2984″	Cassiopeia	550 ± 10	B0.5IVe	Main-sequence	II	
Lambda Scorpii (Shaula)	17^{h} 33^{m} 36.520^{s}	−37° 06′ 13.76″	Scorpius	570	B1.5IV	Main-sequence	II	
Saiph	05^{h} 47^{m} 45.38884^{s}	−09° 40′ 10.5777″	Orion	650 ± 30	B0.5 Ia	Blue Supergiant	II	
Epsilon Pegasi (Enif)	21^{h} 44^{m} 11.15614^{s}	+09° 52′ 30.0311″	Pegasus	690 ± 20	K2 Ib–II	Red supergiant	II	
Pi Puppis (Ahadi)	07^{h} 17^{m} 08.6^{s}	–37° 05′ 51″	Puppis	807+72 −61	K3 Ib	Red supergiant	II?	
Rigel	05^{h} 14^{m} 32.3^{s}	–08° 12′ 06″	Orion	848 ± 65	B8 Ia	Blue supergiant	IIn(pec?)	
S Monocerotis A	06^{h} 40^{m} 58.7^{s}	+09° 53′ 44″	Monoceros	920+150 −110	O7V	Main-sequence	II	
S Monocerotis B	06^{h} 40^{m} 58.7^{s}	+09° 53′ 44″	Monoceros	920+150 −110	O9.5V	Main-sequence	II	
Zeta Puppis (Naos)	08^{h} 03^{m} 35.05^{s}	−40° 00′ 11.3″	Puppis	1,080 ± 40	O4If(n)p	Blue supergiant	II	
Gamma^{2} Velorum A	08^{h} 09^{m} 32.0^{s}	−47° 20′ 12″	Vela	1,120+130 −100	WC8	Wolf–Rayet star	Ib/Ic	
Gamma^{2} Velorum B	08^{h} 09^{m} 32.0^{s}	−47° 20′ 12″	Vela	1,120+130 −100	O7.5III	Blue supergiant	II	
Mintaka Aa1	05^{h} 32^{m} 00.4000^{s}	−00° 17′ 56.7424″	Orion	1,200	O9.5II	Blue supergiant	II	
Alnilam	05^{h} 36^{m} 12.81^{s}	−01° 12′ 06.9″	Orion	1,250±26	B0 Ia	Blue supergiant	II	
Alnitak Aa	05^{h} 40^{m} 45.5^{s}	−01° 56′ 34.3″	Orion	1,260±180	O9.5Iab	Blue supergiant		
Delta Canis Majoris (Wezen)	07^{h} 08^{m} 23.48608^{s}	−26° 23′ 35.5474″	Canis Major	1,600	F8 Ia	Yellow supergiant	II	
HD 49798	06^{h} 48^{m} 04.7^{s}	−44° 18′ 58″	Puppis	1,699±46	sdO5.5/D	White dwarf	Ia	Supernova will occur in a few tens of thousands of years
119 Tauri	05^{h} 32^{m} 12.8^{s}	+18° 35′ 40″	Taurus	1,790+300 −220	M2Iab-Ib	Red supergiant	IIb	
Gamma Cygni (Sadr)	20^{h} 22^{m} 13.70184^{s}	+40° 15′ 24.0450″	Cygnus	1,800	F8 Iab	Yellow supergiant	II	
Deneb	20^{h} 41^{m} 25.9^{s}	+45° 16′ 49″	Cygnus	2,615±215	A2la	Blue supergiant	IIL	
KPD 1930+2752	19^{h} 32^{m} 14.9^{s}	+27° 58′ 35″	Cygnus	2,860+130 −120	sdB/D	White dwarf	Ia	(Note: The Kitt Peak Downes star.)
Mu Cephei (Garnet Star)	21^{h} 43^{m} 30.5^{s}	+58° 46′ 48″	Cepheus	3,060+456 −130	M2Ia	Red hypergiant	IIn/IIb	
Rho Cassiopeiae	23^{h} 54^{m} 23.0^{s}	+57° 29′ 58″	Cassiopeia	3,440+930 −610	G2Ia0e	Yellow hypergiant	IIL	
VY Canis Majoris	07^{h} 22^{m} 58.3^{s}	−25° 46′ 03″	Canis Major	3,930+420 −350	M5eIa	Red hypergiant	II	
IRAS 17163-3907	17^{h} 19^{m} 49.3^{s}	−39° 10′ 37.9″	Scorpius	3,930+990 −660	late B/early A	Yellow hypergiant	II	
Wray 17-96	17^{h} 41^{m} 35.4^{s}	–30° 06′ 39″	Scorpius	3,940+1,110 −710	B3	Luminous blue variable		
VV Cephei A	21^{h} 56^{m} 39.1^{s}	+63° 37′ 32″	Cepheus	4,900	M2Iab	Red hypergiant		
Stephenson 2 DFK 52	18^{h} 39^{m} 23.4^{s}	−06° 02′ 16″	Scutum	4,900	M0I	Red supergiant	II-P	
Mu Sagittarii Aa (Polis)	18^{h} 13^{m} 14.8^{s}	–21° 03′ 32″	Sagittarius	5,100	B8Iap	Blue supergiant		
P Cygni	20^{h} 17^{m} 47.2^{s}	+38° 01′ 59″	Cygnus	5,250±590	B1Ia+	Luminous blue variable	IIb	
HD 168625	18^{h} 21^{m} 19.5^{s}	−16° 22′ 26″	Sagittarius	5,250+600 −490	B6Ia	Luminous blue variable	II	
NML Cygni	20^{h} 46^{m} 25.6^{s}	+40° 06′ 59.4″	Cygnus	5,250+420 −360	M6I	Red hypergiant	II	
IRC +10420	19^{h} 26^{m} 48.1^{s}	+11° 21′ 17″	Aquila	5,600+2,200 −1,200	F8Ia+	Yellow hypergiant	IIb	
WR 142	20^{h} 21^{m} 44.3^{s}	+37° 22′ 31″	Cygnus	5,670+290 −270	WO2	Wolf–Rayet star	Ib/Ic	
RY Scuti	18^{h} 25^{m} 31.48^{s}	−12° 41′ 24.2″	Scutum	5,870	O9.7 Ibpe	Blue supergiant	IIb or Ib/c	
WR 136	20^{h} 12^{m} 06.5^{s}	+38° 21′ 18″	Cygnus	6,700+500 −430	WN6(h)-s	Wolf–Rayet star	Ic	
RS Ophiuchi	17^{h} 50^{m} 13.2^{s}	–06° 42′ 28″	Ophiuchus	7,380+1,000 −790	M2III/D	White dwarf	Ia	
IRAS 00500+6713	00^{h} 53^{m} 11.21^{s}	+67° 30′ 02.4″	Cassiopeia	8,000 ± 500	WD	White dwarf	Ia	
Eta Carinae	10^{h} 45^{m} 03.6^{s}	−59° 41′ 04″	Carina	8,630+69 −68	LBV/O	Luminous blue variable	Ib	
WR 93b	17^{h} 32^{m} 03.3^{s}	−35° 04′ 32″	Scorpius	8,700+1,900 −1,300	WO3	Wolf–Rayet star	Ib/Ic	
WR 102	17^{h} 45^{m} 47.5^{s}	−26° 10′ 27″	Sagittarius	9,410+840 −710	WO2	Wolf–Rayet star	Ib/Ic	
HD 179821	19^{h} 13^{m} 58.6^{s}	+00° 07′ 32″	Aquila	10,500+2,100 −1,500	G5Ia	Yellow hypergiant	IIL	
T Pyxidis	09^{h} 04^{m} 41.5^{s}	−32° 22′ 48″	Pyxis	10,700+1,700 −1,300		White dwarf	Ia	
WR 104	18^{h} 02^{m} 04.1^{s}	–23° 37′ 41″	Sagittarius	13,400+9,200 −3,900	WC9d/OB	Wolf–Rayet star	Ib/Ic with Grb?	
AG Carinae	10^{h} 56^{m} 11.57814^{s}	−60° 27′ 12.8107″	Carina	17,000±1,000	LBV	Luminous blue variable	IIb	
WR 30a	10^{h} 51^{m} 38.9^{s}	−60° 56′ 35.2″	Carina	38,900+18,500 −9,500	WO4/O5((f))	Wolf–Rayet star		
Sher 25	11^{h} 15^{m} 07.8^{s}	−61° 15′ 17″	Carina	43,500+5,200 −4,200	B1.5Iab	Blue supergiant		
LMC195-1	05^{h} 18^{m} 10.3^{s}	−69° 13′ 03″	Dorado	160,000	WO2	Wolf–Rayet star	Ib/Ic	
S Doradus	05^{h} 18^{m} 14.4^{s}	−69° 15′ 01″	Dorado	169,000	LBV	Luminous blue variable		
SMC AB8	01^{h} 31^{m} 04.1^{s}	−73° 25′ 04″	Hydrus	200,000	WO4/O4	Wolf–Rayet star	Ib/Ic	
DR1	01^{h} 05^{m} 01.6^{s}	+02° 04′ 20″	Cetus	2,350,000	WO3	Wolf–Rayet star	Ib/Ic with Grb?	
