= TS 01 =

Most oxygen-poor planetary nebula, in the constellation Ursa Major

Emission nebula
- Planetary nebula
- HST image of TS 01

Observation data: J2000 epoch
- Right ascension: 11^{h} 53^{m} 24.7^{s}
- Declination: +59° 39′ 57.0″
- Distance: (18–22 kpc) 58,708–72,000 ly
- Constellation: Ursa Major
- Designations: PN G135.9+55.9, SBS 1150+599A

TS 01 (also designated PN G135.9+55.9 and SBS 1150+599A) is a planetary nebula in the constellation Ursa Major, located in the Galactic halo, the sparse and ancient outskirts of the Milky Way. It is the most oxygen-poor planetary nebula known, and the first one known to be powered by a double-degenerate binary star: a close pair of compact, white dwarf-like stars. Its distance is estimated at roughly 18–22 kpc (about 60,000–70,000 light-years).

== Discovery and naming ==
The SBS 1150+599A was found in the Second Byurakan Survey and at first classified as a possible cataclysmic variable. In 2001 Tovmassian and colleagues showed from detailed spectroscopy that it is in fact a planetary nebula in the halo, and it received the planetary-nebula designation PN G135.9+55.9. Imaging and spectroscopy by an independent team confirmed its nature as an extremely metal-poor planetary nebula. Because the same object carries both a stellar catalogue name and a nebular one, the astronomers who studied it most closely, Tovmassian and Stasińska, call it TS 01 to avoid confusion between the nebula and the stellar system at its centre.

== The nebula ==
TS 01 is small and elongated, modelled as a prolate ellipsoid with an axis ratio of about 2:1. Its emission lines split into two velocity components, giving an apparent expansion velocity of about 20 to 22 km s⁻¹; modelling that accounts for projection gives about 30 km s⁻¹ for the bulk of the gas. The nebula's age is estimated at several thousand years.

Its spectrum is unusually bare, with very few emission lines. In the most recent analysis its oxygen abundance is about 1/70 of the solar value, with an uncertainty of a factor of two; earlier models had suggested as little as 1/500. Other elements are much less depleted: carbon is about 1/3.5 of solar, nitrogen about 1/4 and neon about 1/11. The progenitor star was born in the ancient, metal-poor halo with an initial mass of about one solar mass or less. Standard models of single-star evolution cannot reproduce this abundance pattern. The explanation proposed is extra mixing inside the star, driven by rotation, by the presence of the close companion, or both; for instance, a model with an initial rotation of 100 km s⁻¹ greatly improves agreement with the observed abundances. This kind of mixing is not in conflict with the binary-interaction history described below.

== The central binary ==
The nucleus is a close binary, discovered by chance when absorption lines in the star's spectrum shifted relative to the nebular lines within a single night. Its orbital period is 3.92 hours, and the two stars are separated by only about the radius of the Sun. It was the first double-degenerate binary found inside a planetary nebula. The two stars are quite different:

- The cooler star has a mass of about 0.54 solar masses and a temperature of 58,000 ± 3,000 K. It nearly fills its Roche lobe and is stretched into an ellipsoidal shape. It is the remnant of the star that most recently shed its envelope, and it is still contracting and heating up.
- The hotter star is more massive, about 0.85 solar masses, and has a temperature of about 160,000–200,000 K. It is detected as an extremely soft X-ray source. It is somewhat larger than an ordinary white dwarf, probably bloated and heated by intense accretion and nuclear burning at its surface in the past. Its mass is estimated dynamically, from simultaneous fits to the radial-velocity and light curves, which favour a total system mass close to the Chandrasekhar limit; an independent estimate from its position in the Hertzsprung–Russell diagram gives about 0.78 solar masses.

Both stars contribute to ionising the nebula: the cooler one provides most of the hydrogen-ionising radiation, while the hotter one is responsible for its most highly charged ions. Photospheric abundances of the cooler star are close to those of the nebula, with only an upper limit on oxygen. A separate study that assumed a central star of 0.595 solar masses derived a distance of about 18 kpc and a temperature of about 138,000 K.

== Formation ==
Models suggest that the system began as two stars in a wide orbit. The more massive star evolved first and engulfed its companion in a common envelope phase, then became a white dwarf; since star formation in the halo ceased about 10 billion years ago, this happened at least that long ago. Later the companion swelled in turn, and a second common-envelope episode shrank the orbit to its present size and ejected the gas now seen as the nebula. The nebula is therefore made from the envelope of the less massive star, not of the hotter, more massive one. Two alternative evolutionary scenarios, which differ in the initial masses of the stars, are proposed.

== Possible Type Ia supernova ==
The combined mass of the two stars is very close to the Chandrasekhar limit, about 1.4 solar masses. If the stars spiral together and merge, which is predicted to occur in roughly 0.7 to 1.2 billion years depending on the scenario, the result could be a Type Ia supernova. This makes TS 01 one of the best candidates known for that route, although it remains a candidate rather than a predicted outcome. The only other comparably promising system known is the hot subdwarf–white dwarf binary KPD 1930+2752, which has a shorter orbital period of 2.28 hours.
