= AB8 =

AB8 or AB-8 may refer to:

- Aichi AB-8; see List of aircraft (0-A)
- AB8 (star)
- ArenaBowl VIII
