= NLTT 12758 =

Binary white dwarf system with degrading orbits

Observation data Epoch J2000.0 Equinox ICRS
- Constellation: Eridanus
- Right ascension: 04^{h} 12^{m} 26.327^{s}
- Declination: −11° 17′ 47.28″
- Apparent magnitude (V): 15.5

Characteristics
- Evolutionary stage: Magnetized WD + non-magnetized WD
- Spectral type: DA

Astrometry
Radial velocity (R_{v})	58.0±3.9 km/s
Proper motion (μ)	RA: 202.726 mas/yr Dec.: −37.248 mas/yr
Parallax (π)	28.4737±0.0345 mas
Distance	114.5 ± 0.1 ly (35.12 ± 0.04 pc)

Details

NLTT 12758A
Mass	0.83 M_{☉}

NLTT 12758B
Mass	0.69 M_{☉}

Database references
SIMBAD	data

NLTT 12758 is a binary system of two white dwarf stars. The pair of white dwarfs are orbiting each other on a 1.154 day orbital period. The total combined mass of these white dwarfs is higher than the Chandrasekhar mass limit which is at 1.4 solar masses. This is important as their orbits are degrading. When they collide, one of two outcomes will likely occur. Either they will accrete their mass and collapse into a neutron star or trigger a type Ia supernova. This will occur in the far future of 10 Hubble times, roughly 140 billion years from now.

Most binary systems of white dwarfs form through common-envelope evolution. It occurs when the more massive star fills its Roche limit during its red giant phase. The second star then starts to accrete material from the red giant in a dynamically unstable process of mass transfer. Then the shedding of the envelope strips both envelopes and the orbital distance shrinks leaving behind two white dwarfs with an orbital period of a few days to a few hours. NLTT 12758A likely underwent this process twice.

== Components ==
The two white dwarfs are similar with a similar mass and a similar age.

=== NLTT 12758A ===
The first white dwarf is the more massive of the two with a mass of 0.83 solar masses. It has a strong magnetic field of 3.1 MG, making it classed as a magnetic white dwarf. It has a spin period of 23 minutes. The fast rotation means its core is likely to be currently crystallizing.

=== NLTT 12758B ===
The second white dwarf in the system is less massive with 0.69 solar masses. It is apparently non-magnetic.

== See also ==
- List of Supernova candidates
