= NGC 602 =

Open cluster in the constrellation Hydrus

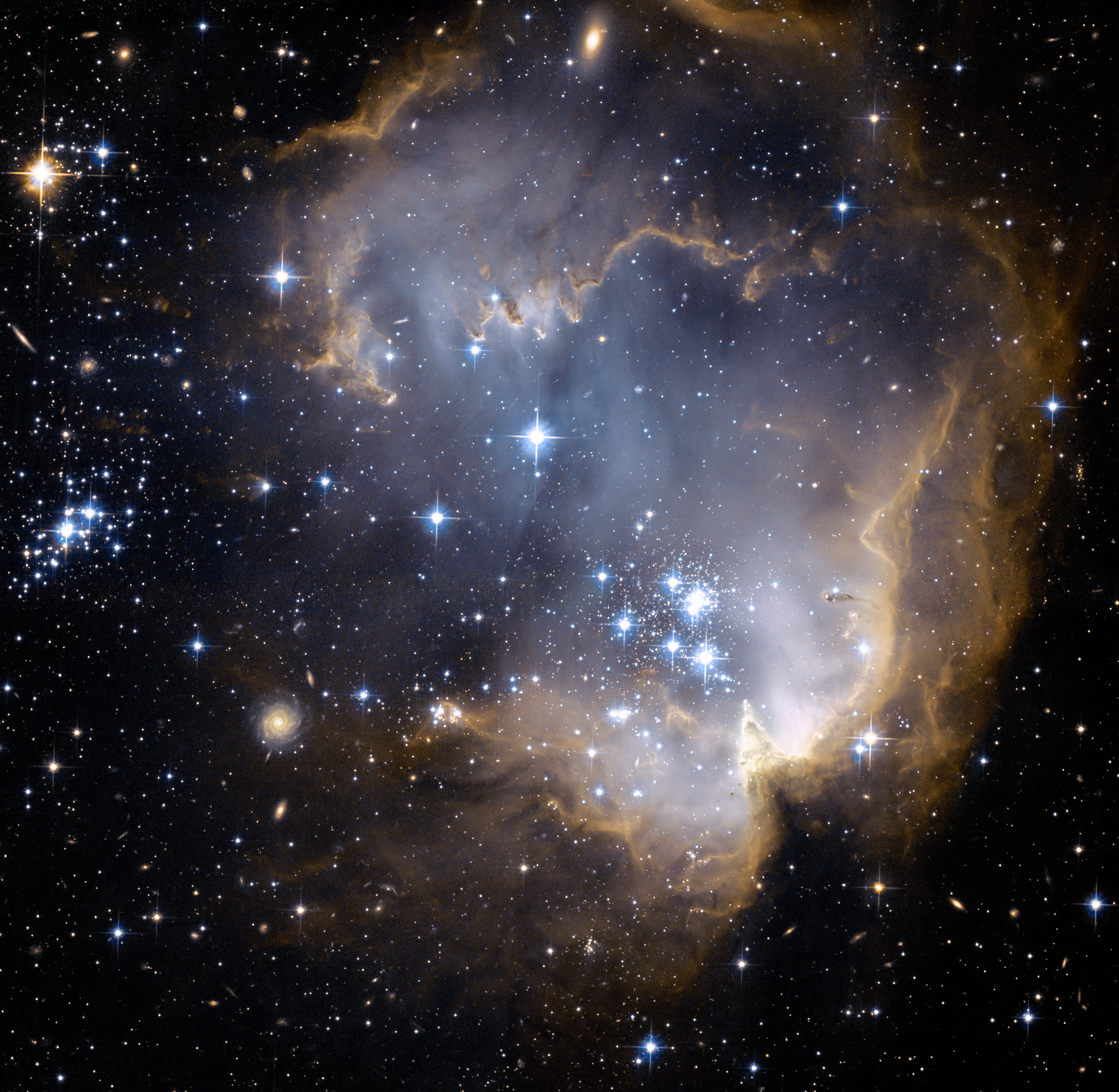
- A Hubble Space Telescope (HST) image of NGC 602 (north is left). Sk 183 is just above centre, NGC 602a just below and left of centre, and NGC 602b towards the left edge

Observation data (J2000 epoch)
- Right ascension: 01^{h} 29^{m} 32.133^{s}
- Declination: −73° 33′ 38.13″
- Distance: 196 kly (61 kpc)
- Apparent magnitude (V): 15.44 (pg)
- Apparent dimensions (V): 2.7'

Physical characteristics
- Mass: M_{☉}
- Radius: 90 ly
- Estimated age: 5 My
- Other designations: N90

Associations
- Constellation: Hydrus

NGC 602 is a young, bright open cluster of stars located in the Small Magellanic Cloud (SMC), a satellite galaxy to the Milky Way. It was discovered on 1 August 1826 by Scottish astronomer James Dunlop. It is embedded in a nebula known as N90.

Radiation and shock waves from the stars of NGC 602 have pushed away much of the lighter surrounding gas and dust that is N90, and this in turn has triggered new star formation in the ridges (or "elephant trunks") of the nebula. These even younger, pre–main sequence stars are still enshrouded in dust but are visible to the Spitzer Space Telescope at infrared wavelengths. The cluster is of particular interest because it is located in the wing of the SMC leading to the Magellanic Bridge. Hence, while its chemical properties should be similar to those of the rest of the galaxy, it is relatively isolated and so easier to study.

NGC 602 contains three main condensations of stars. The central core is NGC 602a, with the compact NGC 602b 100 arc-seconds to the NNW. NGC 602c is a looser grouping 11 arc-minutes to the NE, which includes the WO star AB8.

NGC 602 includes many young O and B stars and young stellar objects, with few evolved stars. Ionisation in the nebula is dominated by Sk 183, an extremely hot O3 main sequence star visible as the bright isolated star at the centre of the Hubble image.

A population of candidate brown dwarfs was found in NGC 602 in 2024. This was the first detection of brown dwarfs outside the Milky Way.

A number of other, more distant galaxies also appear in the background of the Hubble Space Telescope images of NGC 602, making for a "tantalizing" and "grand" view.

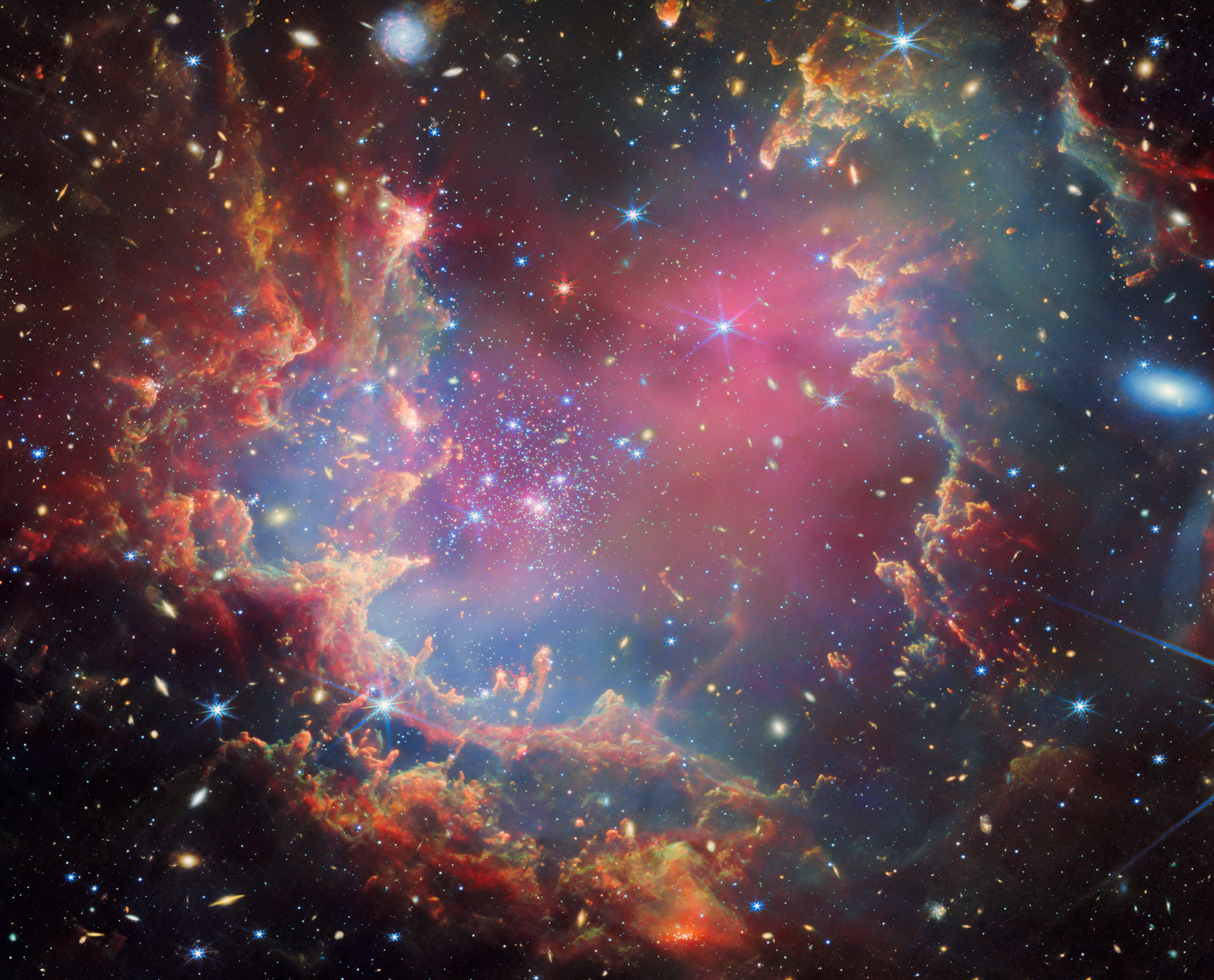
NGC 602 by the James Webb Space Telescope, 2024

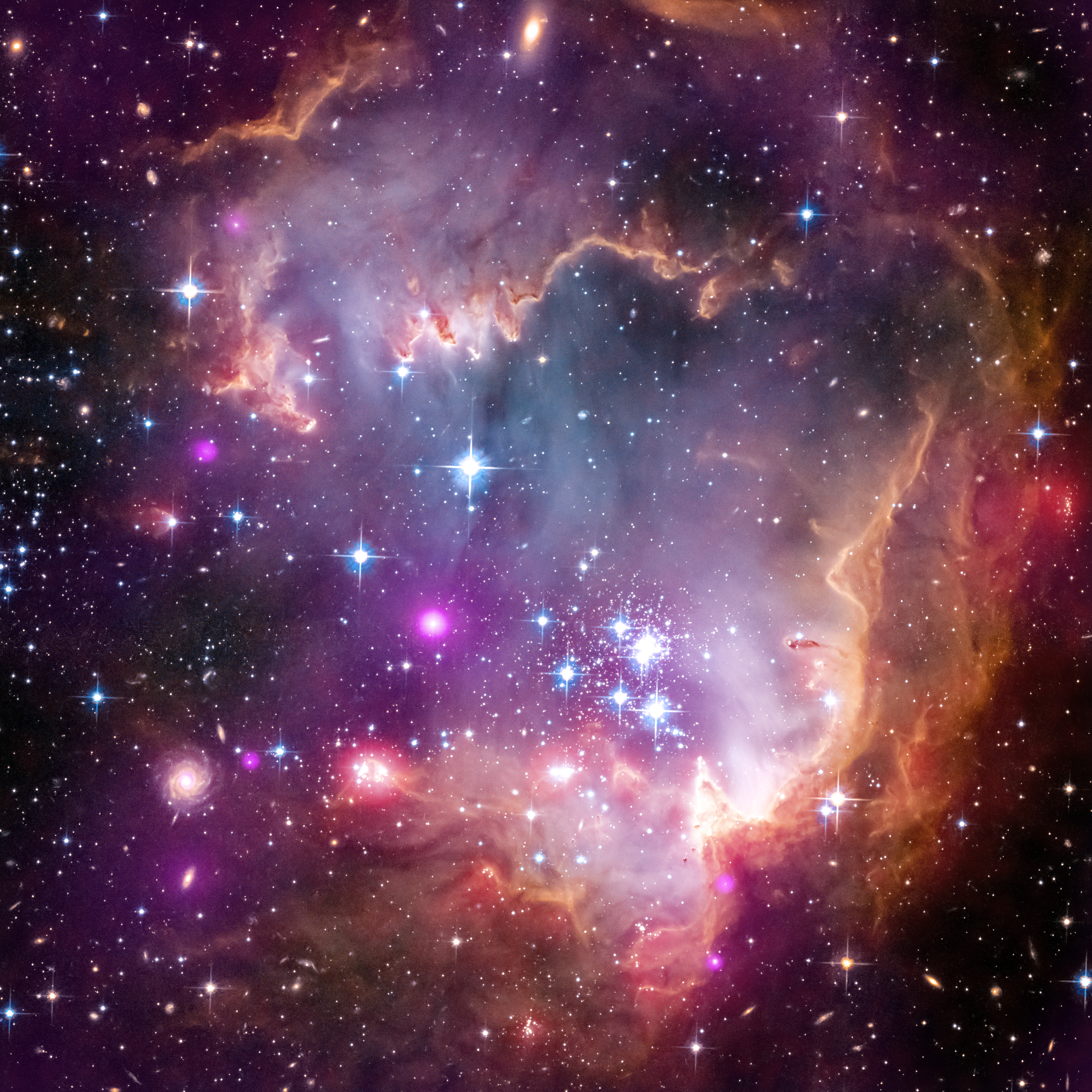
Composite x-ray/optical/infrared image

NGC 602 region of the SMC

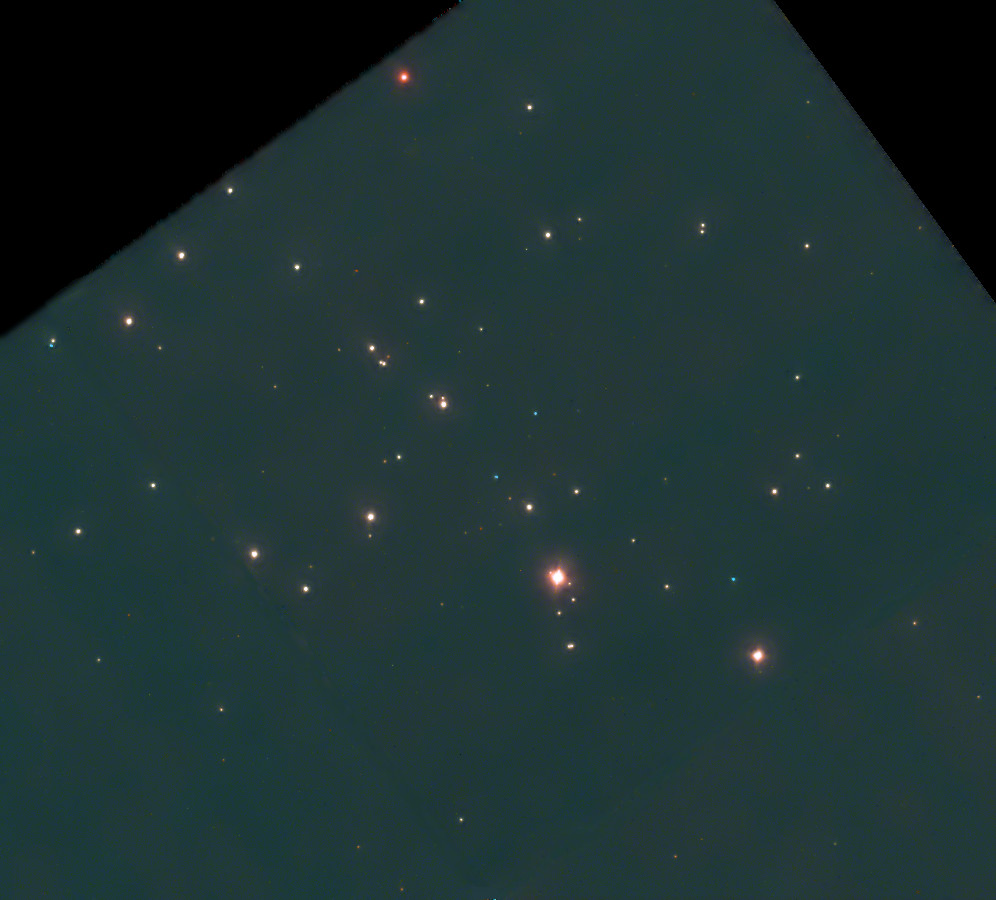
NGC 602c closeup

== See also ==
- List of NGC objects (1–1000)
