= WR 93b =

Wolf-Rayet star in the constellation of Scorpius

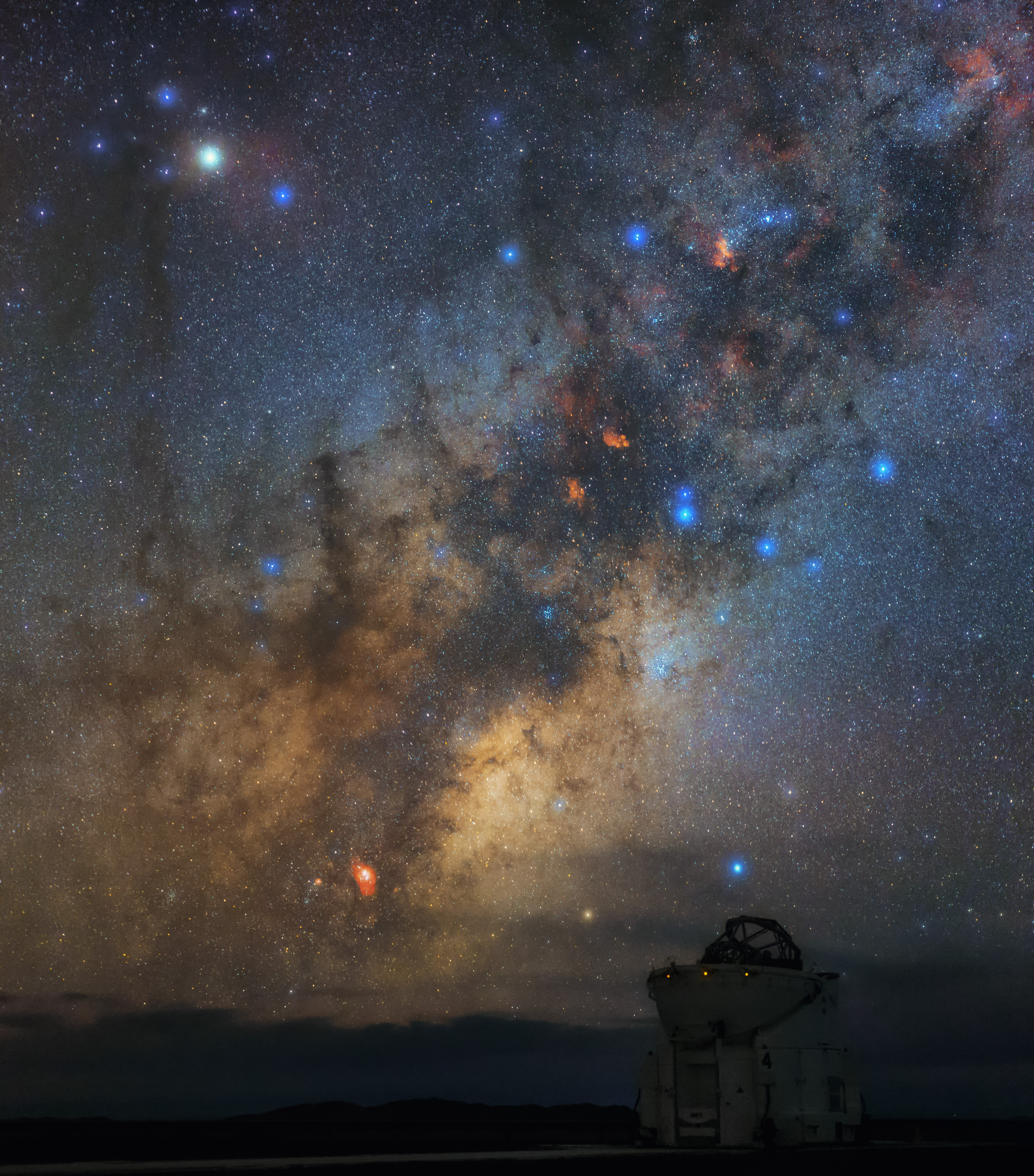
- Location of WR 93b (circled in red). Scorpius runs across the top of the image from Antares at top left to the end of the tail on the right.

Observation data Epoch J2000.0 Equinox J2000.0
- Constellation: Scorpius
- Right ascension: 17^{h} 32^{m} 03.308^{s}
- Declination: −35° 04′ 32.62″
- Apparent magnitude (V): 15.2

Characteristics
- Evolutionary stage: Wolf-Rayet star
- Spectral type: WO3
- Apparent magnitude (B): 16.9
- Apparent magnitude (R): 14.4
- Apparent magnitude (J): 11.331
- Apparent magnitude (K): 10.17

Astrometry
Proper motion (μ)	RA: −0.642±0.032 mas/yr Dec.: −2.1055±0.024 mas/yr
Parallax (π)	0.4298±0.0288 mas
Distance	7,600 ± 500 ly (2,300 ± 200 pc)

Details
Mass	8.1+1.9 −1.2 M_{☉}
Radius	0.44 R_{☉}
Luminosity	110,000+53,000 −30,000 L_{☉}
Temperature	160,000 K

Other designations
- 2MASS J17320330-3504323, SSTGLMC G353.2744-00.8460

Database references
SIMBAD	data

WR 93b is a Wolf-Rayet star in the constellation Scorpius, an extremely rare star on the WO oxygen sequence. It appears near NGC 6357 in the tail of the scorpion.

== Discovery ==
WR 93b was discovered in 2003 during a study of emission line stars from the AAO/UKST Southern Galactic Plane Hα Survey. It was published as the fourth galactic WO class star in 1994. This was too late to be included in the VIIth Wolf Rayet catalogue, but it is listed in an annex published in 2006.

It lies in the direction of the Galactic Center and is thought to be part of the Scutum-Crux spiral arm. It is highly reddened and interstellar extinction causes it to be 6.5 magnitudes fainter at visual wavelengths than it otherwise would be.

== Features ==
WR 93b, of spectral classification WO3, is one of the very few known oxygen-sequence Wolf-Rayet stars, just four in the Milky Way galaxy and six in external galaxies. Modelling the atmosphere gives a luminosity around 110,000 L_{☉}, very low for a Wolf-Rayet star. It is a very small dense star, with a radius less than half of the sun's but with a mass nearly 10 solar masses (M_{☉}). Very strong stellar winds, with a terminal velocity of 5,000 kilometers per second are causing WR 93b to lose 10^{−5} M_{☉}/year. For comparison, the Sun loses (2–3)×10^{−14} M_{☉} per year due to its solar wind, several hundred million times less than WR 93b.

== Evolutionary status ==
WO Wolf-Rayet stars are the last evolutionary stage of the most massive stars before exploding as supernovae, possibly with a gamma-ray burst. It is very likely that WR 93b is on its last stages of nuclear fusion, near or beyond the end of helium burning. It has been calculated that WR 93b will explode as a supernova within 8,000 years.

== See also ==
- WR 102
- WR 142
- WR 30a
- List of supernova candidates
