= WR 30a =

Binary star in the constellation Carina

- Location of WR 30a (circled in red)

Observation data Epoch J2000.0 Equinox J2000.0
- Constellation: Carina
- Right ascension: 10^{h} 51^{m} 38.906^{s}
- Declination: −60° 56′ 34.91″
- Apparent magnitude (V): 12.73

Characteristics
- Evolutionary stage: Wolf–Rayet + giant?
- Spectral type: WO4 + O5((f))
- U−B color index: −0.22
- B−V color index: +1.04
- Variable type: WR

Astrometry
Proper motion (μ)	RA: −5.642 mas/yr Dec.: 2.842 mas/yr
Parallax (π)	0.1201±0.0099 mas
Distance	6,720+1,400 −1,090 pc
Absolute magnitude (M_{V})	−5.39 (−2.80 + −5.38)

Orbit
Primary	WR
Name	O
Period (P)	4.619 days
Semi-major axis (a)	35.4 R_{☉}
Eccentricity (e)	0.2
Inclination (i)	20 ± 5°
Semi-amplitude (K_{1}) (primary)	189 km/s
Semi-amplitude (K_{2}) (secondary)	25 km/s

Details

WR
Mass	7.5-9.7 M_{☉}
Radius	0.88 (Note: Applying the Stefan–Boltzmann law with a nominal solar effective temperature of 5,772 K: $$\sqrt{(5772/129500)^4 * 195,000} = 0.88\ R\odot$$) R_{☉}
Luminosity	195,000 L_{☉}
Temperature	129,500 K

O
Mass	40-60 M_{☉}

Other designations
- WR 29a, V574 Carinae, GSC 08958-04143, MS4

Database references
SIMBAD	data

WR 30a is a massive spectroscopic binary in the Milky Way galaxy, in the constellation Carina. The primary is an extremely rare star on the WO oxygen sequence and the secondary a massive class O star. It appears near the Carina Nebula but is much further away.

== Discovery ==
WR 30a was discovered in a photographic survey in the constellation Carina using the Curtis-Schmidt Telescope at the Cerro Tololo Inter-American Observatory. It was listed as MS4 out of nine new discoveries, classified only as "WR::".

WR 30a was entered into the sixth catalogue of galactic Wolf–Rayet stars at the last minute with the designation WR 29a and a spectral class of "WR + ABS". A review of Wolf-Rayet stars in 1984 reported that WR 30a had a right ascension greater than WR 30 and should correctly be numbered 30a rather than 29a. The name was corrected in the seventh edition of the catalogue.

Still in 1984, WR 30a was studied spectroscopically and assigned a WC4 class. Another 1984 study noted dilution of some emission lines, and suggested the presence of a binary companion of approximate spectral type O4. The WO spectral classification had already been defined, but neither paper considered WR 30a to show sufficiently high excitation lines or strong oxygen lines to merit that classification. A WO spectral class was eventually assigned, with relatively weak Ovi emission but confirmed by the lack of Ciii emission. A WO5 class was temporarily assigned to account for the unusually low excitation, but it was confirmed at WO4 when quantitative criteria for the WO sub-classes were defined.

The identification of the companion remained only as an approximate O4 until 2001, when detailed spectroscopy assigned an O5((f)) class. This is based on the existence of narrow Niii emission lines at 463.4 - 464.1 nm, and the identification of strong Heii absorption at 468.6 nm. The luminosity class could not be determined with certainty, but a supergiant can be ruled out and the line widths suggest a giant class is most likely.

== System ==
WR 30a is a close spectroscopic binary containing a WO4 star and a non-supergiant O5 star. They orbit each other every 4.916 days. Although spectral lines from both stars can be detected and orbital radial velocity variations measured, the orbit is still poorly known. The primary has highly broadened emission lines which are difficult to measure accurately, and the secondary has a relatively low orbital speed due to its high mass. Measurements of different spectral lines and different portions of line profiles lead to different results. Some components of the spectrum are produced by stellar winds not moving at orbital velocity with the stars.

The stars do not eclipse each other, but they are deformed by the gravity and show small brightness variations during the orbit. These brightness variations are regular and consistent over long periods, so the orbital period is known accurately. The inclination can be estimated from the mass function and the colliding winds. The eccentricity is small and the most accurate model of spectral line profile variations during the orbit gives an eccentricity of 0.2. The semi-major axis of the orbit is 35.4 R_{☉}, with the WO star moving in an ellipse of semi-major axis 30 R_{☉} and the more massive O companion in an ellipse of semi-major axis 5.4 R_{☉}. The separation of the stars varies from 28 R_{☉} to 42 R_{☉}.

Although the hot secondary star produces what would typically be considered a fast stellar wind, it is entirely overpowered by the wind from the primary star. The shock front where the winds collide is approximately a cone around the O star with a half angle of 50°. The apex of the shock cone is estimated to lie at 25 R_{☉} from the WO stars and 10 R_{☉} from the O star. 10 R_{☉} is comparable to the radius of a typical non-supergiant O5 star so that its own wind is forced back against the surface of the star.

== Variability ==
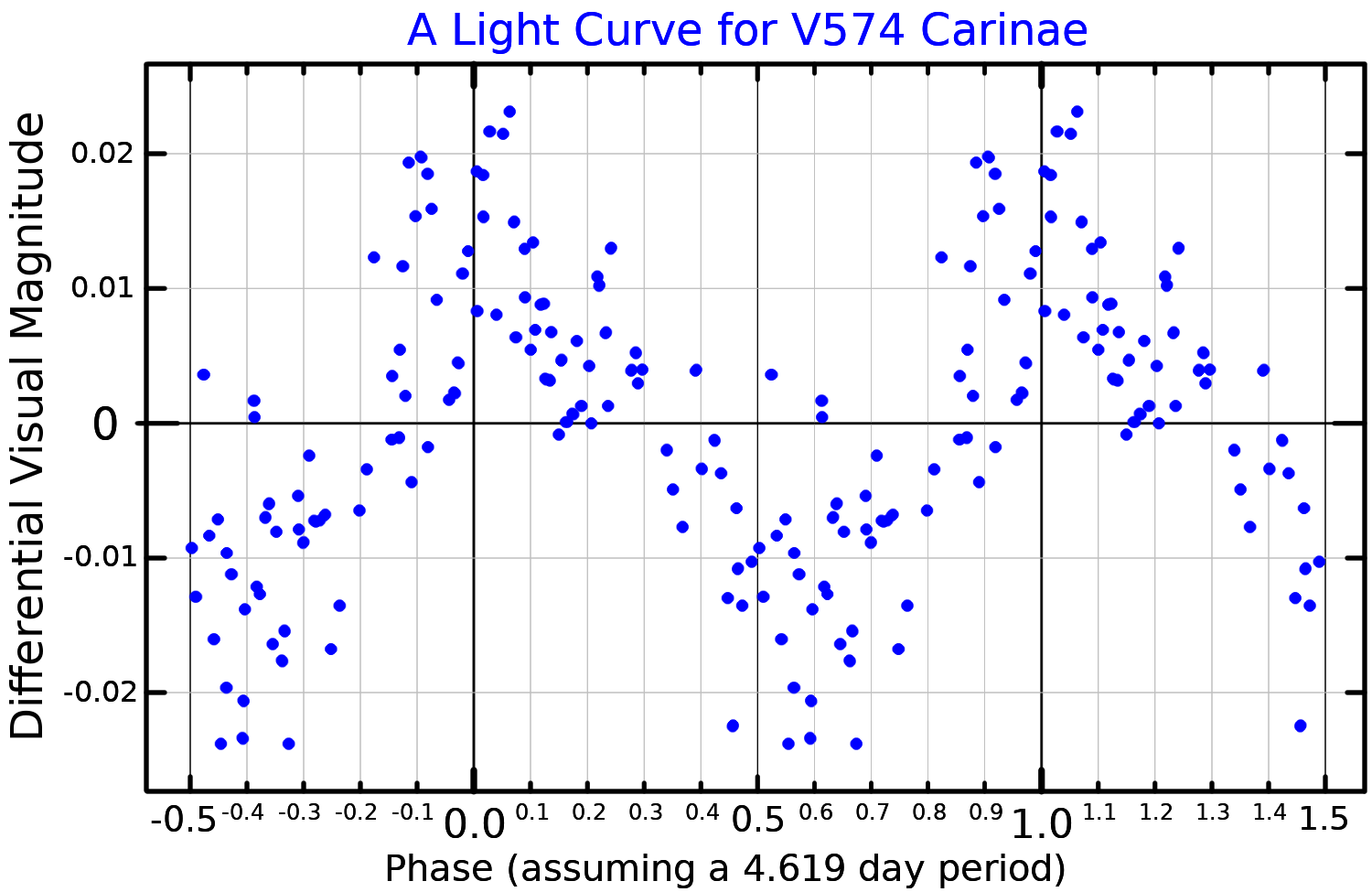
A visual band light curve for WR 30a (V574 Carinae), adapted from Gosset et al. (2001)

Eric Gosset et al. announced that WR 30a is a variable star, in 2001. It was given its variable star designation, V574 Carinae, in 2003. WR 30a shows regular and continuous brightness variations of 0.02 magnitudes with a stable period of 4.6 days. These are ascribed to the orbital motion and to the deformed shapes of the two stars. In addition, the system shows occasional very rapid brightness of up to 0.2 magnitudes. These brightness changes have only been seen at visual wavelengths and last for only a few hours. At blue wavelengths the variations are either not seen, or sometimes a small opposite brightness change. They are not predictable but there is a possible period around three days. The cause of these brightness changes is completely unknown.

== Features ==
The primary star, of spectral classification WO4, is one of the very few known oxygen-sequence Wolf-Rayet stars, just four in the Milky Way galaxy and five in external galaxies. Modelling the atmosphere gives a luminosity around 195,000 L_{☉}. It is a very small dense star, with a radius less than the sun's but with a mass nearly 10 solar masses. Very strong stellar winds, with a terminal velocity of 4,500 kilometers per second are causing WR 30a A to lose over 10^{−5} M_{☉}/year. For comparison, the Sun loses (2–3)×10^{−14} M_{☉}/year due to its solar wind, several hundred million times less than WR 30a.

The secondary star has an O5 spectral class. It is not a supergiant, but could be a main sequence or giant star. Some helium lines and nitrogen emission is detected in the spectrum, indicating the mixing of fusion products to the surface and a strong stellar wind.

The secondary star is visually over 10 times brighter than the primary and over five times more massive, although the primary dominates the appearance of the spectrum. Researchers are careful to avoid ambiguity about the star defined as the primary and typically refer to the components as "WR" and "O".

WR 30a is a very strong x-ray source. This is expected for a colliding-wind binary, but the source of the x-rays has not been conclusively determined. They may have a thermal or non-thermal origin.

== Evolutionary status ==
WO Wolf-Rayet stars are the last evolutionary stage of the most massive stars before exploding as supernovae, possibly with a gamma-ray burst. It is very likely that WR 30a is on its last stages of nuclear fusion, near or beyond the end of helium burning. Single-star evolutionary models of the WO component of WR 30a suggest it started life as a rapidly rotating 120 M_{☉} star which has now lost over 90% of its mass.

== See also ==
- WR 102
- WR 142
- WR 93b
- List of supernova candidates
