= IC 1613 =

Irregular dwarf galaxy in the constellation Cetus

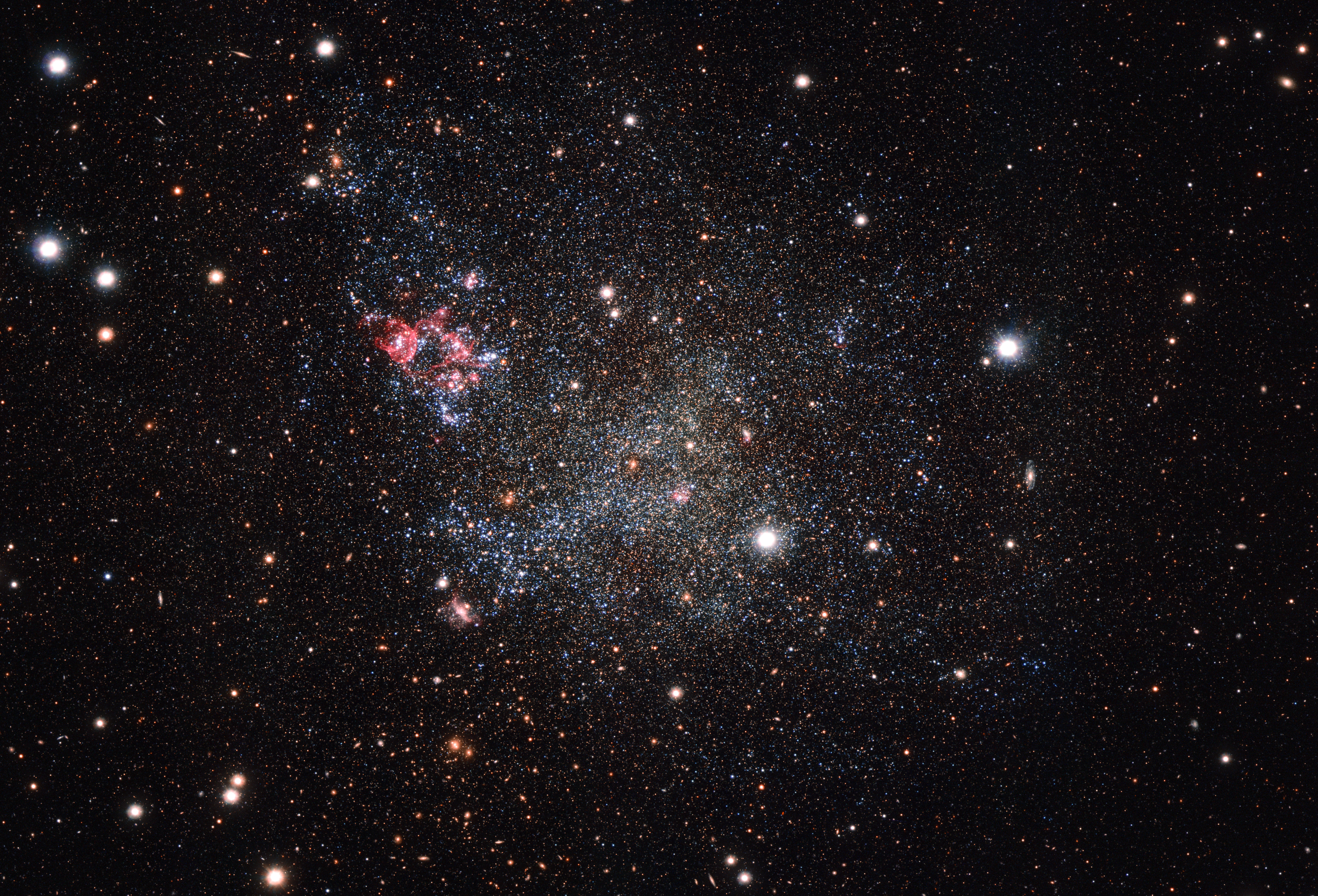
- IC 1613 captured with the VST's OmegaCAM.

Observation data (J2000 epoch)
- Constellation: Cetus
- Right ascension: 01^{h} 04^{m} 47.8^{s}
- Declination: +02° 07′ 04″
- Redshift: −234±1 km/s
- Distance: 2.38±0.07 Mly (730±20 kpc)
- Group or cluster: Local Group
- Apparent magnitude (V): 9.9
- Absolute magnitude (V): −15.2

Characteristics
- Type: IB(s)m
- Mass: (1.1±0.2)×10^{8} M_{☉}
- Apparent size (V): 16.2′ × 14.5′

Other designations
- UGC 668, DDO 8, PGC 3844, Caldwell 51

IC 1613 (also known as Caldwell 51) is an irregular dwarf galaxy located on the outskirts of the Local group around 730 kiloparsecs from Earth in the constellation of Cetus near the star 26 Ceti. It has a low mass with its mass only being around 10^{8} solar masses. It has played an important role in the calibration of the Cepheid variable period–luminosity relation for estimating distances. Other than the Magellanic Clouds, it is one of the few Local Group dwarf irregular galaxy where RR Lyrae-type variables have been observed; this factor, along with an unusually low abundance of interstellar dust both within IC 1613 and along the line of sight enable especially accurate distance estimates. IC 1613 was discovered in 1906 by Max Wolf, and is approaching Earth at 234 km/s.

There are many faint galaxies close to IC 1613, 14 of which are catalogued as members of a yet-unnamed galaxy cluster located at z≈0.20.

== Stellar population ==
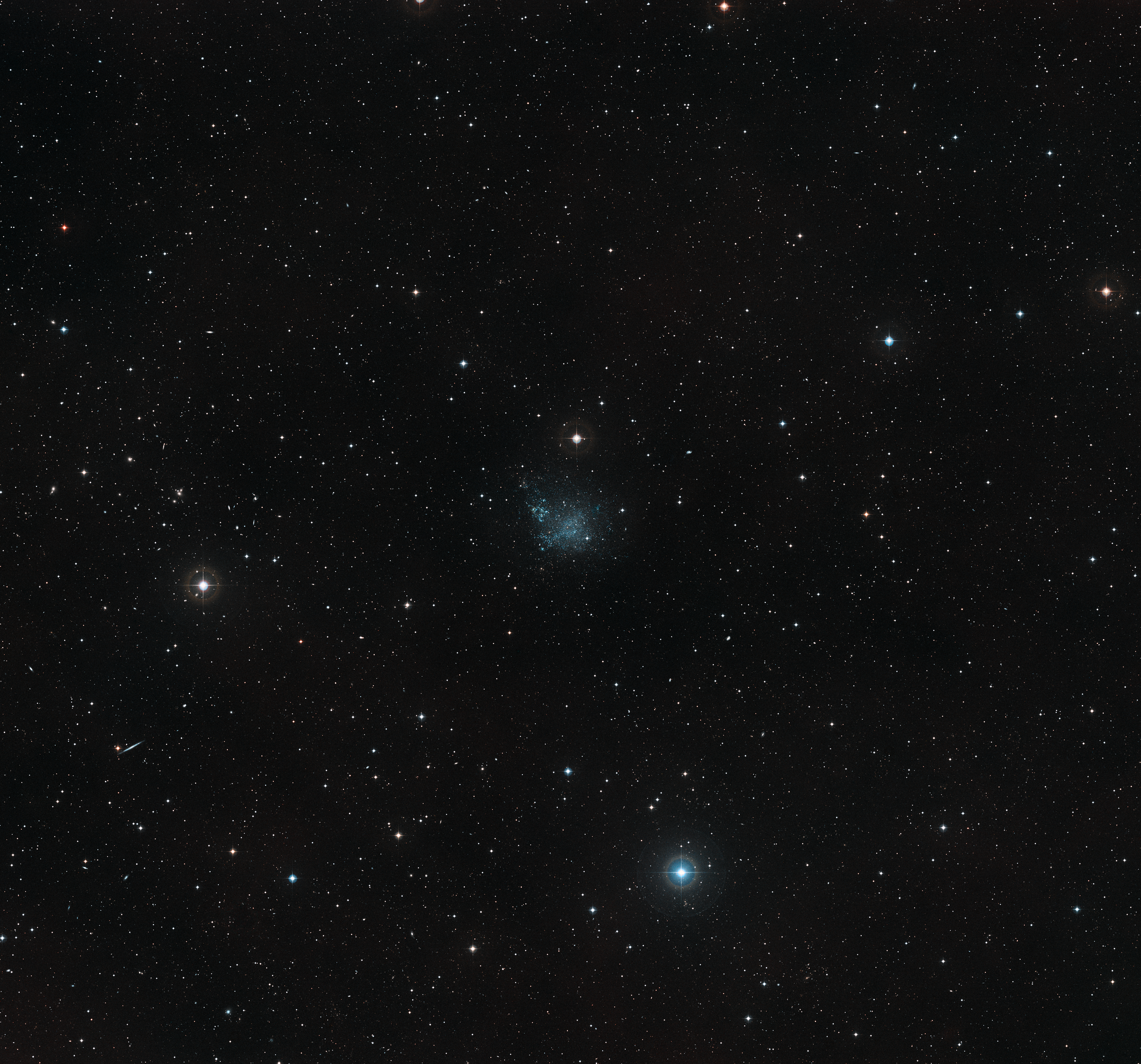
The sky around IC 1613, with 26 Ceti towards the bottom of the frame (south) and 29 Ceti to the left (east)

It is one of the few irregular dwarf galaxies in the Local group where RR Lyrae-type variable stars have been observed. Others include the Magellanic Clouds. In 1999, Cole et al. used the Hubble Space Telescope (HST) to find that the dominant population of this galaxy has an age of ~7 Gyr. Using its Hess diagram, they found that its evolutionary history may be similar to that of the Pegasus Dwarf Irregular Galaxy. Both galaxies are classified as Ir V in the DDO system. Also in 1999, Antonello et al. found five cepheids of Population II in IC 1613, giving self-evident support for the existence of a very old stellar population component of IC 1613. In 1999, King, Modjaz, & Li discovered the first nova ever detected in IC 1613.

IC 1613 contains a WO star known as DR1, which might be the only Wolf–Rayet star in the galaxy, although a candidate WC+O binary, SPIRITS14bqe, has been found. A luminous blue variable candidate has been proposed but a revised classification led to a B2.5 III type. Moreover, a rich population of OB-type stars and OB associations has been discovered.

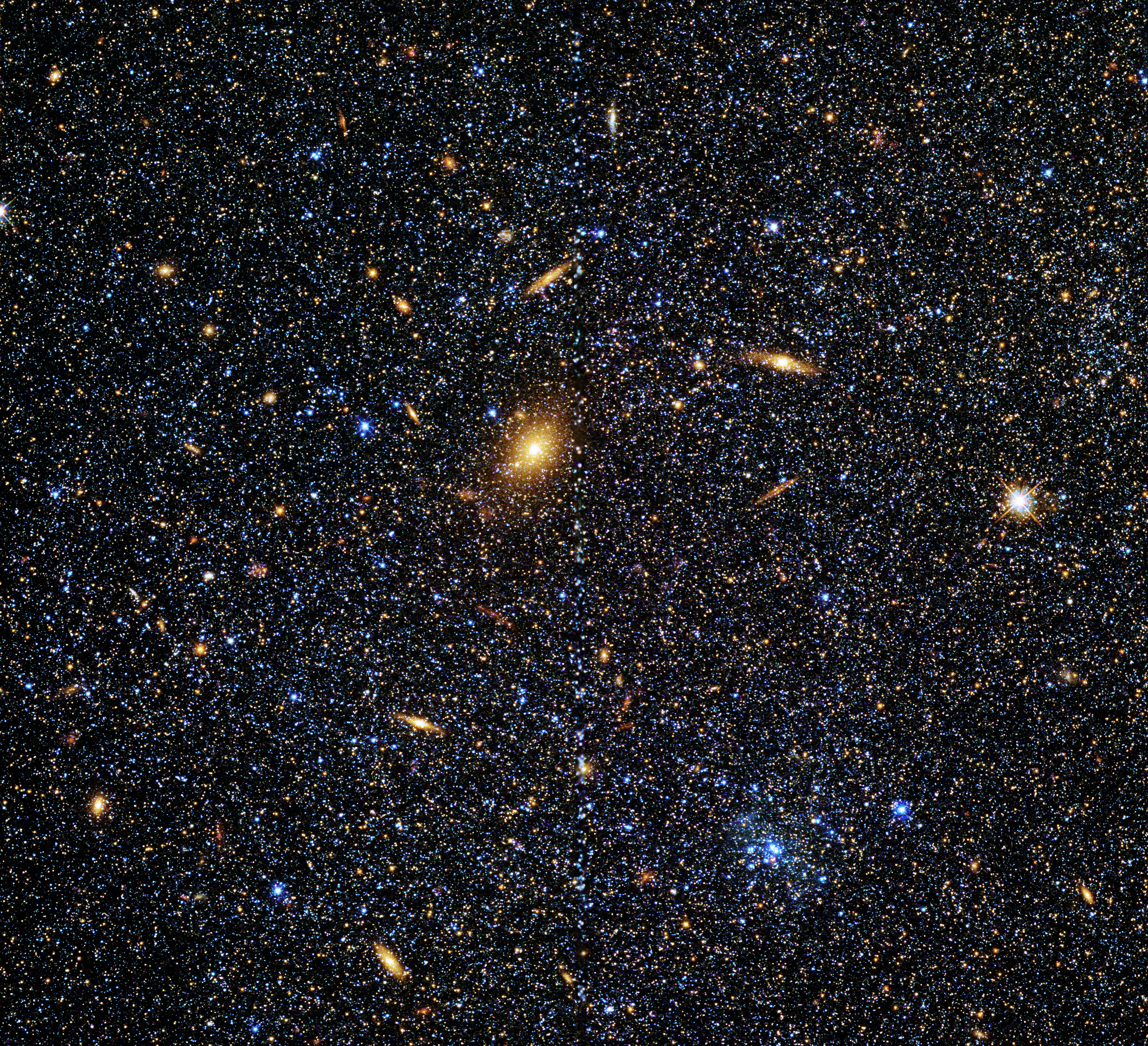
Hubble image of the central part of IC 1613, showing the faint galaxies of a background galaxy cluster.

GHV-62024 is a O6-type star located in this galaxy that shows characteristics of F-type stars. It has a fast rotation which likely causes strong CNO mixing, the products of which contaminate the stars surface.

=== Supernova remnants ===
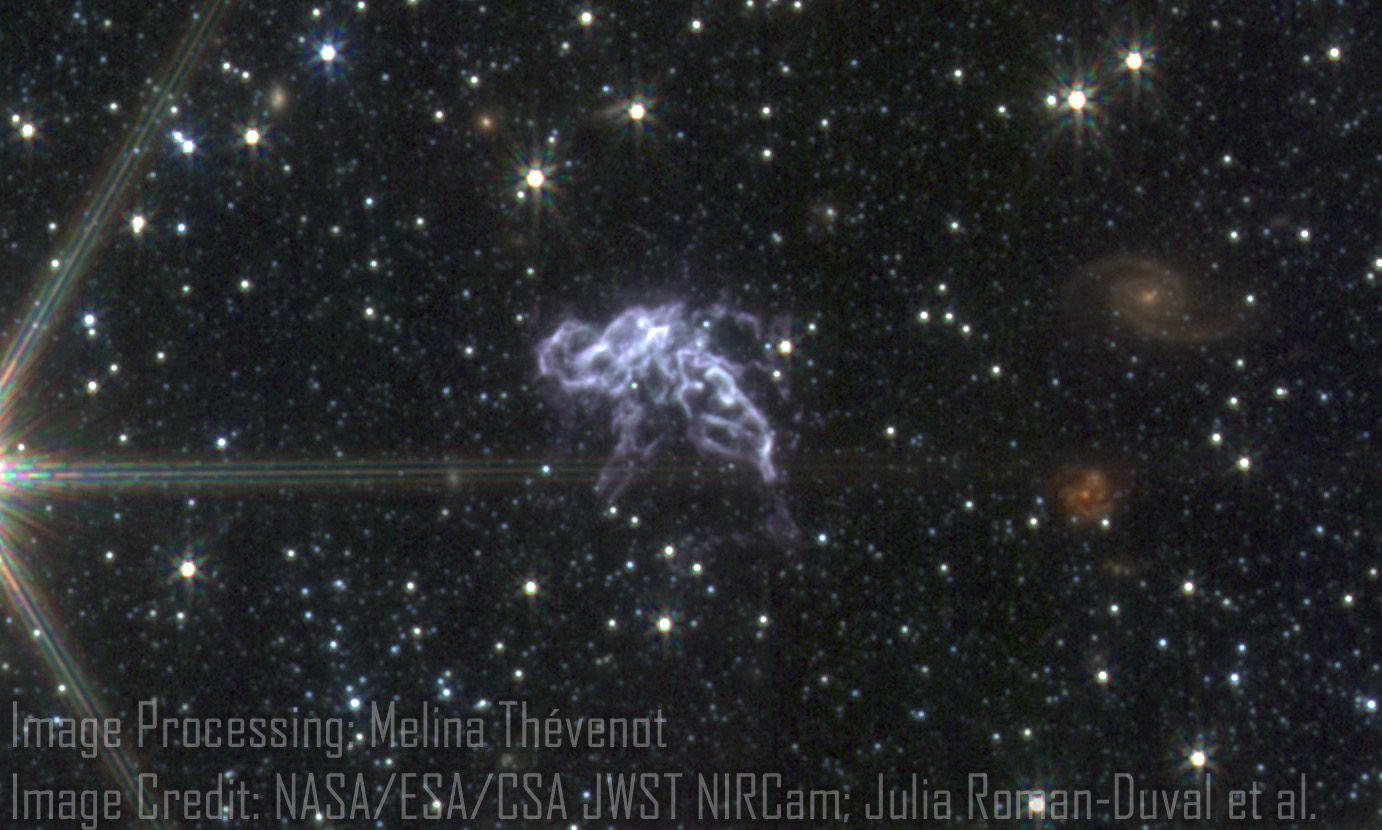
JWST image of the young supernova remnant S8

Many studies have studied the interstellar medium of IC 1613 such as H l and H ll complexes. There has currently been one recognized supernova remnant (SNR) which has been named S8. There may also be another remnant with a shell-like structure with a diameter of 55 parsecs. S8 was first identified by Allan Sandage as emission nebula no. 8 in 1971. He used the 200-inch Hale reflector. A study using data from the MDM Observatory found that S8 is a very young supernova remnant. The nebula has an estimated mass of 119±34 M_{☉} and an age between 2700 and 4400 years.
