= Berkeley 87 =

Open cluster

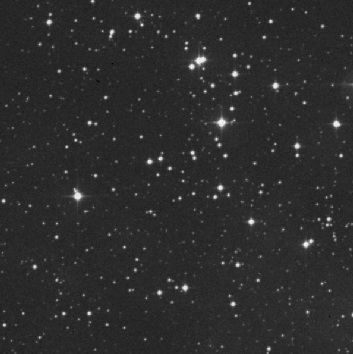

Observation data (J2000 epoch)
- Right ascension: 20^{h} 21^{m} 43.01^{s}
- Declination: +37° 22′ 13.8″
- Distance: ~1650 pc
- Absolute magnitude (V): 7.9
- Apparent dimensions (V): 8

Physical characteristics
- Other designations: Dolidze 7, OCl 161, C 2019+372, OCISM 34, MWSC 3325

Associations
- Constellation: Cygnus

Berkeley 87 is an open cluster in a heavily obscured region of the Milky Way in Cygnus. The rare WO type Wolf–Rayet star WR 142 is a member of Berkeley 87.

This cluster contains HD 229059, which, as of August 2021, is the nearest known star to Earth with a bolometric luminosity greater than 1 million L_{☉}.

Star name	Effective temperature	Absolute magnitude	Bolometric magnitude	Mass (M_{☉})	Spectral type
WR 142 (Berkeley 87–29)	200000 K	-3.13	-10.1	28.6	WO2
HD 229059 (Berkeley 87–3)	26300 K	-7.7	-10.3	69	B1Ia
Berkeley 87-25	35700 K	-5.6	-9.1	39	O8.5III
Berkeley 87-15	37800 K	-5	-8.6	34	B[e]
Berkeley 87-4	29500 K	-5	-7.9	23	B0.2III

== See also ==
- List of most massive stars
