= WDJ181058.67+311940.94 =

White dwarf system

Observation data Epoch J2000.0 Equinox ICRS
- Constellation: Hercules
- Right ascension: 18^{h} 10^{m} 58.67^{s}
- Declination: +31° 19′ 40.94″

Characteristics
- Evolutionary stage: White dwarf + white dwarf

Astrometry
Distance	160 ly (49 pc)

Orbit
Period (P)	14.23557 ± 0.00002 h
Semi-major axis (a)	0.01601 ± 0.00015 AU
Semi-amplitude (K_{1}) (primary)	93.9 ± 2.0 km/s
Semi-amplitude (K_{2}) (secondary)	95.7 ± 2.1 km/s

Details

A
Mass	0.834±0.039 M_{☉}
Radius	0.0101+0.0005 −0.0002 (Note: Derived from known mass and surface gravity of star) R_{☉}
Luminosity	0.0082+0.0013 −0.00170.0195+0.0008 −0.0009 (Note: Derived from known surface temperature and calculated radius of star) L_{☉}
Surface gravity (log g)	8.350+0.066 −0.052 cgs
Temperature	17,260+1,380 −880 K

B
Mass	0.721 ± 0.020 M_{☉}
Radius	0.0116±0.0002 R_{☉}
Luminosity	0.0195+0.0008 −0.0009 L_{☉}
Surface gravity (log g)	8.164+0.027 −0.030 cgs
Temperature	20,000+400 −2,000 K

Other designations
- WDJ181058.67+311940.94

Database references

WDJ181058.67+311940.94 is a white dwarf binary system around 160 light-years (49 pc) away in the constellation Hercules, discovered in 2024 as part of the DBL Survey I by the William Herschel Telescope located at the Roque de los Muchachos Observatory. The total mass of the system is about 1.555 solar masses, above the Chandrasekhar mass. The two white dwarfs are 1/60 AU (2.5 million km) from each other. They are approaching each other and will collide in around 22.6 billion years, resulting in a Type Ia supernova that is more luminous than usual. The resulting supernova will have an apparent magnitude of −16, outshining the Moon in the night sky.

== Properties ==
WDJ181058.67+311940.94 is composed of two white dwarfs located around 160 ly (49 pc) away in the constellation Hercules, with a combined mass of 1.555 M_{☉}. The smaller (primary) star is around 0.843 M_{☉} and 0.0101 R_{☉} and the larger (secondary) star is around 0.721 M_{☉} and 0.0116 R_{☉}. The secondary star is also slightly hotter than the primary star, with a temperature of 20 000 K compared to 17 260 K. The system is one of the first confirmed compact double white dwarf binary systems.

Currently, the two white dwarfs have an orbital period of 14.24 hours and are separated by around 0.016 AU (3.4 R_{☉}). The stars are approaching each other and are estimated to collide in 22.6 ± 1.0 Gyr, with a merger time on the same order as a Hubble time.

== Projected supernova ==
The pair of stars is expected to explode in a Type Ia supernova, as its combined mass exceeds the Chandrasekhar limit. As the two white dwarfs inspiral and emit their energy in the form of gravitational waves, their separation will slowly decrease until the secondary star initiates Roche lobe overflow and mass from the secondary begins to accrete onto the primary, around 100 years before the supernova occurs. Approximately one minute before the detonation, the system's orbital period will have decreased to around 39 s, the separation between the two stars will have shrunk to 0.03 R_{☉}.

Once the accretion stream has reached a sufficient density, interactions between the accretion stream and the surface of the primary white dwarf will trigger helium detonation at the point of contact, which rapidly encircles the primary and drives a shockwave into its core, causing carbon detonation there as well and blowing the star apart. The shockwave caused by the destruction of the primary then sets off a similar sequence of events in the secondary star, with its core igniting only around 4 s after the first, leaving no remnant behind. The supernova will release a total of 1.2 × 10^{51} erg of energy and a peak absolute visual magnitude of −17.8.

== Implications ==
WDJ181058.67+311940.94 is one of the first pieces of evidence of super-Chandrasekhar mass white dwarf binary systems, which decreases the discrepancy between the expected and observed rate of the birthrate of these systems to a factor of two. Determining the rate of Type Ia supernovae caused by such systems is crucial, as Type Ia supernovae are often used as standard candles in determining distances to deep-sky objects.

== See also ==
- List of supernova candidates
