= AB8 (star) =

Binary star located in the Small Magellanic Cloud in the constellation Hydrus

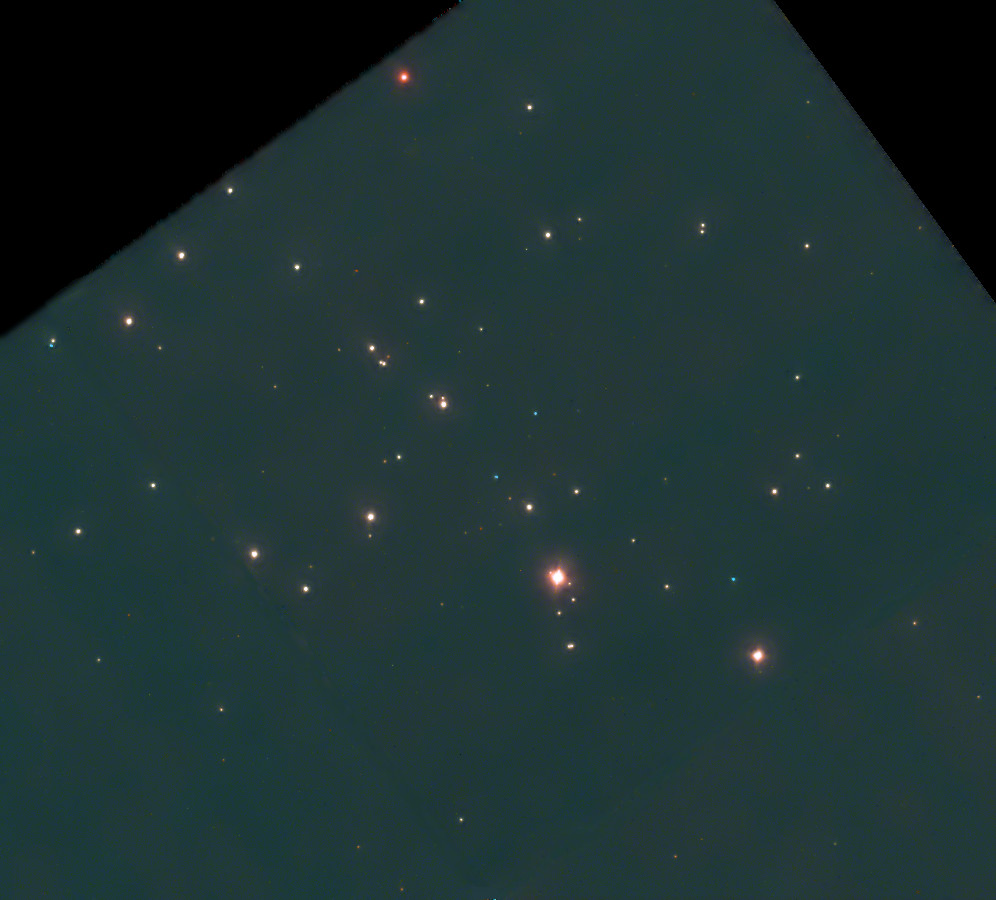
- AB8 is the brightest star in the cluster NGC 602c. Credit: Hubble Legacy Archive

Observation data Epoch J2000.0 Equinox ICRS
- Constellation: Hydrus
- Right ascension: 01^{h} 31^{m} 04.137^{s}
- Declination: −73° 25′ 03.78″
- Apparent magnitude (V): 12.83

Characteristics
- Spectral type: WO4 + O4V
- U−B color index: −1.17
- B−V color index: −0.16

Astrometry
Radial velocity (R_{v})	237.97±1.15 km/s
Proper motion (μ)	RA: +1.135 mas/yr Dec.: −1.312 mas/yr
Parallax (π)	0.0259±0.0536 mas
Distance	197,000 ly (61,000 pc)
Absolute magnitude (M_{V})	−6.3 (−4.9/−5.9)

Orbit
Period (P)	16.638 days
Semi-major axis (a)	108 R_{☉}
Eccentricity (e)	0.10±0.03
Inclination (i)	40±10°
Semi-amplitude (K_{1}) (primary)	157 km/s
Semi-amplitude (K_{2}) (secondary)	54.7 ± 1.6 km/s

Details

WR
Mass	19 M_{☉}
Radius	2 R_{☉}
Luminosity	1.4 million L_{☉}
Surface gravity (log g)	5.1 cgs
Temperature	141,000 K

O
Mass	61 M_{☉}
Radius	14 R_{☉}
Luminosity	708,000 L_{☉}
Surface gravity (log g)	4.0 cgs
Temperature	45,000 K
Rotational velocity (v sin i)	120 km/s
Age	3.0 Myr

Other designations
- AB 8, SMC WR 8, LIN 547, Sk 188, 2MASS J01310412-7325038, Sanduleak 1

Database references
SIMBAD	data

AB8, also known as SMC WR8, is a binary star in the Small Magellanic Cloud (SMC). A Wolf–Rayet star and a main-sequence companion of spectral type O orbit in a period of 16.638 days. It is one of only nine known WO stars, the only Wolf–Rayet star in the SMC not on the nitrogen sequence, and the only Wolf–Rayet star in the SMC outside the main bar.

== Discovery ==
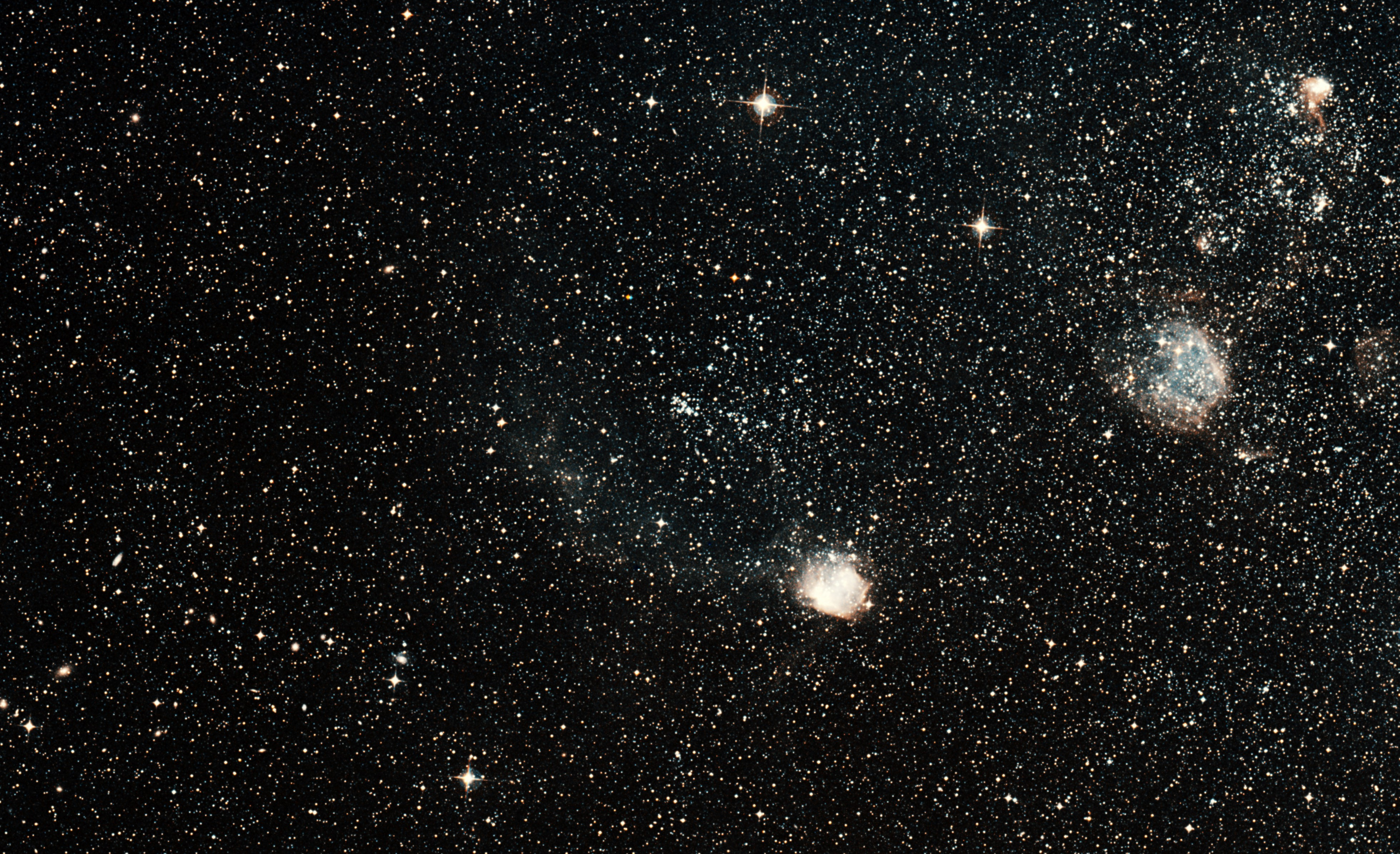
NGC 602c (centre) is a portion of the larger NGC 602 cluster. Below (south) is the N90 Hii region around NGC 602a, with the N89 Hii region on the right.

AB8 was discovered by Eric Lindsay in 1961, when it was catalogued as entry 547 in a list of emission line objects in the SMC. Sanduleak listed it as a confirmed member of the SMC, gave a spectral type of WR + OB, and identified it as one of only five stars that were not nuclei of planetary nebulae, but showed O_{VI} emission in their spectra. These would later be formally grouped as the WO class, the oxygen sequence of Wolf–Rayet stars.

In 1978, before the WO class was coined, Breysacher and Westerlund gave a spectral type of WC4? + OB. The definitive catalogue of Wolf Rayet stars in the SMC was published shortly after by Azzopardi and Breysacher, with AB8 the eighth out of a grand total of eight stars. These are referred to as SMC WR stars, or SMC AB, or more commonly just AB.

== Location ==
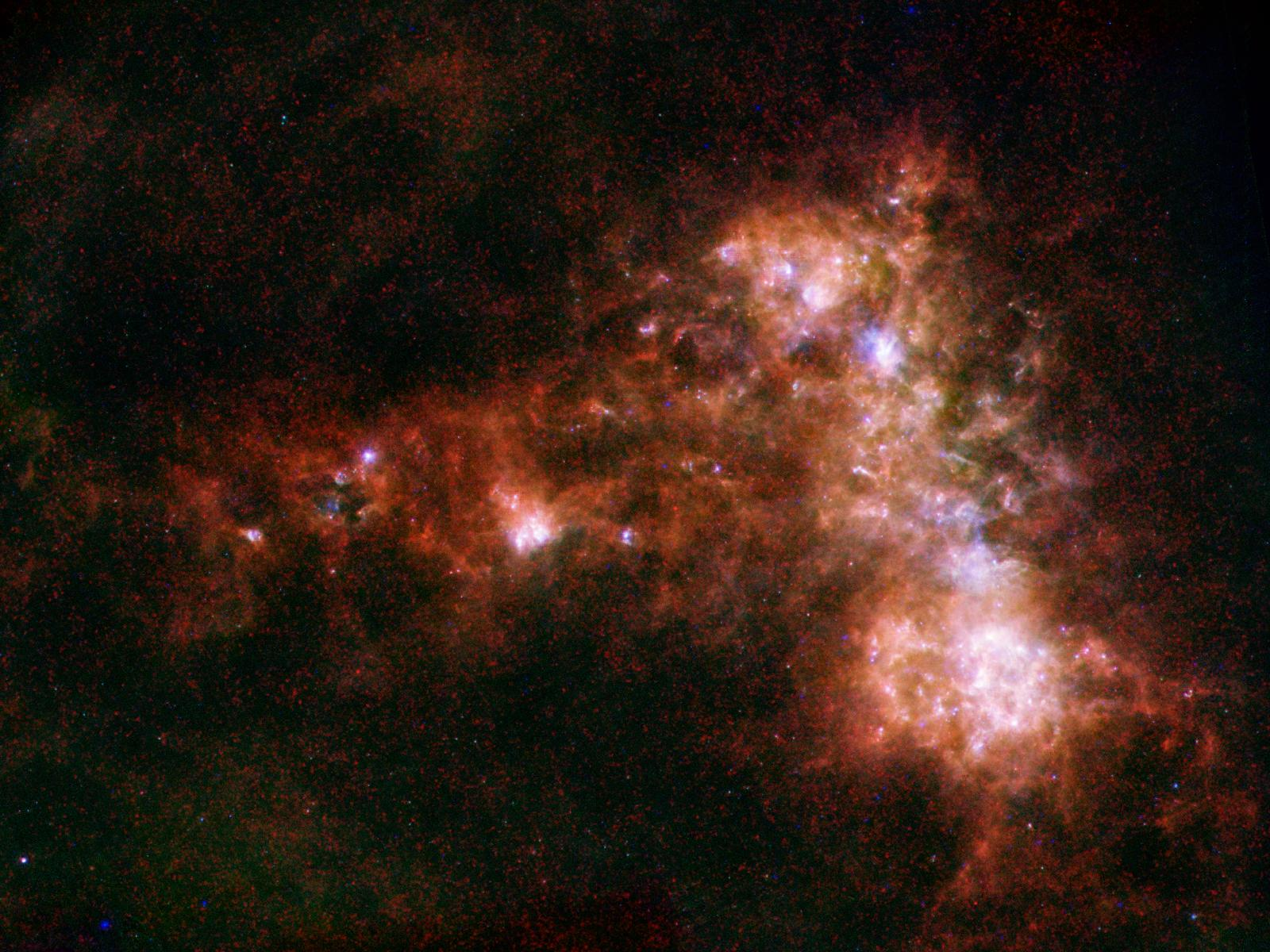
AB8 is found at the tip of the SMC wing, at the left of this image just above the bright NGC 602 (Herschel & Spitzer infrared image at 24–250 μ).

AB8 is located at the end of the wing of the Small Magellanic Cloud, two to three thousand parsecs from the main bar. It is the brightest member of an open cluster discovered in 1958 and then listed as LIN 107. It lies close to the massive NGC 602 cluster and is sometimes considered to be just a condensation within a large stellar association including NGC 602. It is referred to as NGC 602c, where NGC 602a is the prominent main cluster.

Although the Small Magellanic Cloud lies mostly within the constellation Tucana, the wing extends into Hydrus. The NGC 602 region, including AB8, lies within the borders of the constellation Hydrus.

== The stars ==
=== Spectrum ===
The spectrum of AB8 shows many strong emission lines of highly ionized carbon and oxygen that clearly identify it is a WO star although the exact subclass is unclear. It has previously been classified as WO3, but it now considered to be the cooler WO4. The emission lines dominate the spectrum, but the profile of many lines shows an absorption wing produced by a hot class O companion. The profiles are variable due to doppler shifting produced as the stars orbit at high velocity. The electromagnetic radiation of the primary is concentrated in the far ultraviolet, so the visual and ultraviolet spectra are dominated by the secondary star. Classification of both stars is complicated by the line blending. The first SMC WR catalogue considered it as "WC4? + OB".

AB8 has not been detected as an x-ray source. This is unexpected because close pairs of hot luminous stars are expected to produce copious x-ray emission from colliding winds. The colliding winds are detected via their impact on emission lines in the spectrum, but not the x-rays.

=== Orbit ===
The spectrum of AB8 shows radial velocity variation of the WR emission lines and narrower absorption lines with a well-defined period of 16.6 days. The relative size of the spectral line Doppler shifts indicates the mass ratio of the two stars, which shows that the primary has about one third the mass of the secondary. The shape of the radial velocity curves can be used to derive the eccentricity of the orbits which are almost circular. Eclipses of the stars are not seen, although models of the system predict a wind eclipse that should produce a detectable brightness change. Distinct changes in the spectral line profiles are seen varying in sync with the orbital phase. An orbital inclination of 40° is derived to most closely match all the observations.

=== Properties ===
The total visual brightness of AB8 can be determined fairly accurately at absolute magnitude (M_{V}) −6.1, 23,500 times brighter than the Sun. The components cannot be observed separately and the contribution from each component can only be estimated. The O star dominates the visual spectrum and produces around 70% of the brightness, leading to M_{V} −5.9, and −4.9 for the primary.

The effective temperatures of the stars can be calculated directly by modelling the atmospheres of both stars to reproduce the observed spectrum in detail. This method results in a temperature of 141,000 K for the WR component and 45,000 K for the O companion. The effective temperature is useful for modelling the atmosphere and comparison between stars, but a typical "observed" temperature at optical depth 2/3 can be significantly different for stars with a dense stellar wind. In the case of the WR primary star, the optical depth temperature is 115,000 K.

The simplest way to measure the luminosity of a star is to observe its radiated output at all wavelengths (the spectral energy distribution or SED) and sum them together. However, this method is impractical for AB8 because the majority of the radiation occurs in the far ultraviolet. A more common method is to measure the visual luminosity and apply a bolometric correction to give the total luminosity at all wavelengths, although the size of the bolometric correction is extremely sensitive to the effective temperature. Modelling the atmospheres gives luminosities for the WR and O component of over 1 million L_{☉} and 708,000 L_{☉}, respectively. Deriving the relative luminosities of the two components from the profile of the O_{VI} resonance line gives a luminosity of 250,000 L_{☉} for the primary, but this would imply an unreasonably low temperature.

The radius of a star with strong stellar wind is poorly defined since any strong density discontinuity that might be defined as a surface is entirely hidden from view. Commonly used definitions of the radius in such cases include: a temperature radius; an optical depth radius; and a transformed radius. The differences are only significant in the case of the WR component. The temperature radius is the radius of a uniform disc that would produce the known luminosity at the calculated effective temperature, and is 2 R_{☉}. The radius at optical depth 2/3 is 3 R_{☉}. The transformed radius is a value used in the modelling of the atmosphere and is 2.5 R_{☉}. The O component radius is 14–15 R_{☉}.

The masses of each component in the AB8 system can be determined from the binary orbit. With the assumption of an inclination of 40°, the derived masses are 19 M_{☉} and 61 M_{☉}. The secondary is more massive and visually brighter, but not more luminous.

Both components of AB8 have powerful stellar winds and are losing mass rapidly. Wind speeds of 3,700 km/s for the primary and 3,200 km/s for the secondary are calculated, with mass loss from the primary a billion times higher than the sun, and 10 million times higher for the secondary star. The WR wind is sufficiently dense that it obscures the photosphere of the star, leading to the unusual spectrum consisting almost entirely of emission lines broadened by the rapid expansion and turbulence of the wind. The high wind speeds and closeness of the stars mean that where the winds collide the material is shocked to temperatures over 500 million K.

=== Evolution ===
Supernova type by initial mass and metallicity

A model has been developed to show the evolution of a binary system leading to the currently observed state of AB8. The initial state has a 150 M_{☉} primary and 45 M_{☉} secondary. The more massive primary leaves the main sequence after approximately 2.2 million years and overflows its roche lobe. In around 100,000 years it transfers 25 M_{☉} to the secondary star. The primary continues to lose mass rapidly for several hundred thousand years, while the secondary maintains approximately the same mass. At a model age of three million years, the system matches the current observations.

The original chemical abundances of the two stellar components are assumed to be typical of the SMC, with metallicity one fifth to one tenth of solar levels. In its current state, the WR component shows dramatically different abundances, with hydrogen and nitrogen entirely absent. It consists of 30% carbon, 30% oxygen, and the remainder mostly helium. It may still be fusing helium in its core, but WO stars are expected to have depleted their core helium and started to fuse carbon or even heavier elements. The O type companion is still a core hydrogen-burning main-sequence star.

In both the primary and secondary star, their cores will eventually collapse, resulting in a supernova explosion. The initially more massive primary will collapse first, as a type Ic supernova, within 10,000 years. The secondary will live on as a single star, or possibly in a binary with a supernova remnant, for a few million years before it also explodes as a supernova, probably a type Ib. Massive stars at SMC metallicity may produce low-luminosity supernovae, or even collapse directly to a black hole without a visible explosion.

== See also ==
- WR 102
- WR 142
- LMC195-1
- AB7
- Large Magellanic Cloud
- List of most massive stars
