= KPD 1930+2752 =

Binary star system

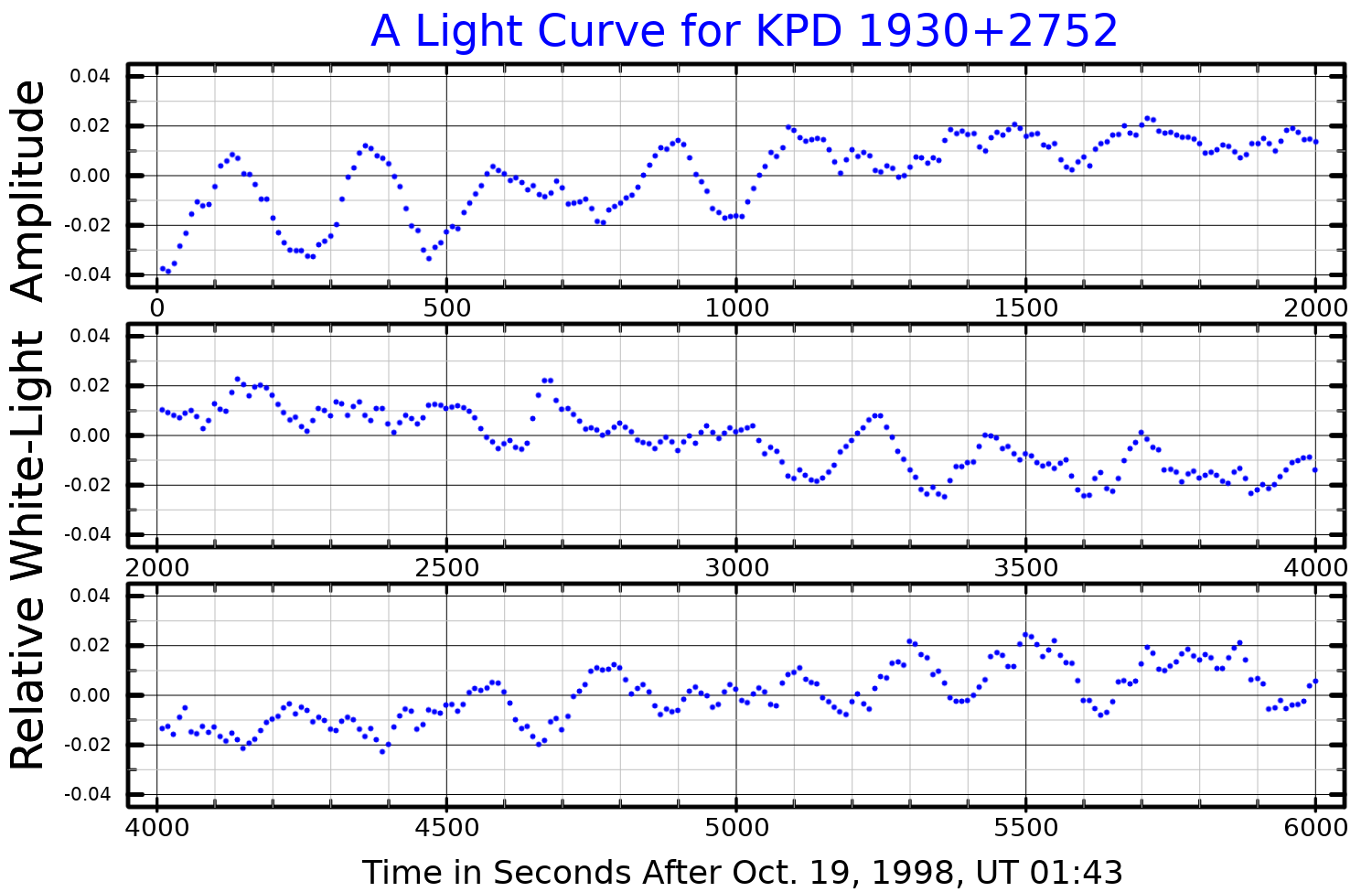
- A white-light light curve for KPD 1930+2752, adapted from Billères et al. (2000)

Observation data Epoch J2000 Equinox ICRS
- Constellation: Cygnus
- Right ascension: 19^{h} 32^{m} 14.81^{s}
- Declination: +27° 58′ 35.4″
- Apparent magnitude (V): 13.82

Characteristics
- Spectral type: sdB+D?
- Variable type: V351 Hya

Astrometry
Radial velocity (R_{v})	5.0 km/s
Proper motion (μ)	RA: 1.600 mas/yr Dec.: −0.550 mas/yr
Parallax (π)	1.1900±0.0373 mas
Distance	2,740 ± 90 ly (840 ± 30 pc)

Orbit
Period (P)	0.095 days
Eccentricity (e)	0
Semi-amplitude (K_{1}) (primary)	349 km/s

Details

subdwarf
Mass	0.5 M_{☉}
Radius	0.18 R_{☉}
Luminosity	45 L_{☉}
Surface gravity (log g)	5.61 cgs
Temperature	35,200 K

white dwarf
Mass	0.97±0.01 M_{☉}
Radius	0.01 R_{☉}

Other designations
- V2214 Cyg, 2MASS J19321480+2758354

Database references
SIMBAD	data

KPD 1930+2752 is a binary star system including a subdwarf B star and a probable white dwarf with relatively high mass. Due to the nature of this astronomical system, it seems like a likely candidate for a potential Type Ia supernova, a type of supernova which occurs when a white dwarf star takes on enough matter to approach the Chandrasekhar limit, the point at which electron degeneracy pressure would not be enough to support its mass. However, carbon fusion would occur before this limit was reached, releasing enough energy to overcome the force of gravity holding the star together and resulting in a supernova.

The total mass of the binary star system slightly exceeds the Chandrasekhar limit, making this system a candidate as a progenitor for a future Type Ia supernova, although future mass loss is likely to reduce system mass below threshold.

== See also ==
- IK Pegasi, the nearest supernova progenitor candidate
