= WR 102 =

Star in the constellation Sagittarius

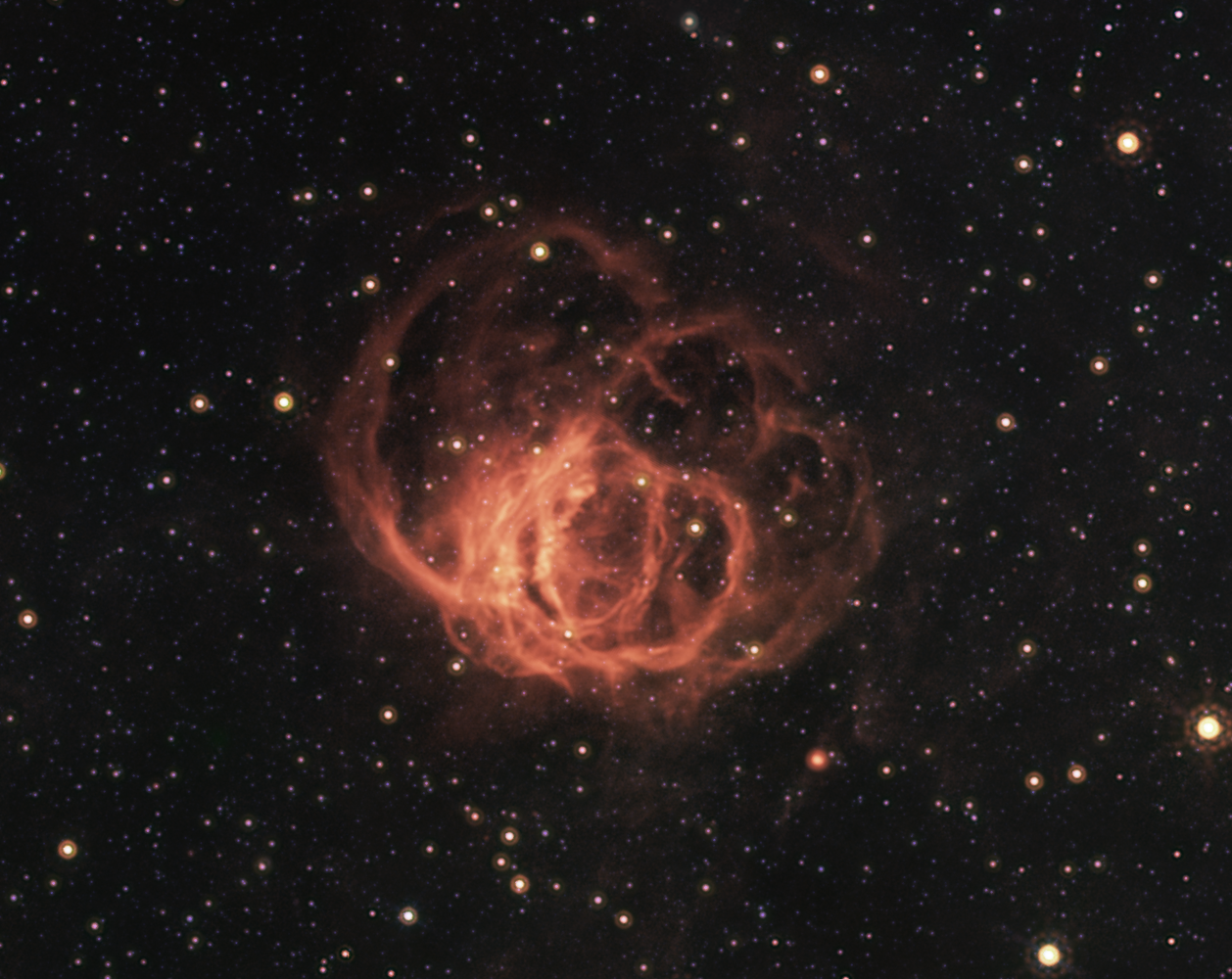
- Infrared image of the nebulosity around WR 102; Credit: WISE

Observation data Epoch J2000.0 Equinox J2000.0
- Constellation: Sagittarius
- Right ascension: 17^{h} 45^{m} 47.541^{s}
- Declination: −26° 10′ 27.78″
- Apparent magnitude (V): 14.10

Characteristics
- Evolutionary stage: Wolf–Rayet star
- Spectral type: WO2
- B−V color index: +0.77

Astrometry
Proper motion (μ)	RA: +0.672 mas/yr Dec.: −0.059 mas/yr
Parallax (π)	0.3421±0.0208 mas
Distance	9,500 ± 600 ly (2,900 ± 200 pc)
Absolute magnitude (M_{V})	−1.46

Details
Mass	16.1+1.7 −1.4 M_{☉}
Radius	0.52 R_{☉}
Luminosity	380,000+66,000 −49,000 L_{☉}
Temperature	200,000 K
Metallicity [Fe/H]	0.0 dex

Other designations
- V3893 Sagittarii, LS 4368, ALS 4368, Sand 4

Database references
SIMBAD	data

WR 102 is a Wolf–Rayet star in the constellation Sagittarius, an extremely rare star on the WO oxygen sequence. It is a luminous and very hot star, highly evolved and close to exploding as a supernova.

== Discovery ==
WR 102 was first mentioned as the possible optical counterpart to a peculiar X-ray source GX 3+1. However, it became clear that it was a separate object and in 1971 it was highlighted as a luminous star with unusual O_{VI} emission lines in its spectrum. It was classified as a WC star, an unusual one because of the highly ionized emission lines, and not the central star of a planetary nebula. It was seen to vary in brightness and was given the variable star designation V3893 Sagittarii in the 62nd name-list of variable stars.

Faint nebulosity was discovered around WR 102 in 1981 and was identified as a wind-blown bubble. In 1982, a set of five luminous stars with highly ionised oxygen emission lines, including WR 102, was used to define the WO class of Wolf–Rayet stars. They were identified as highly evolved massive stars.

== Features ==
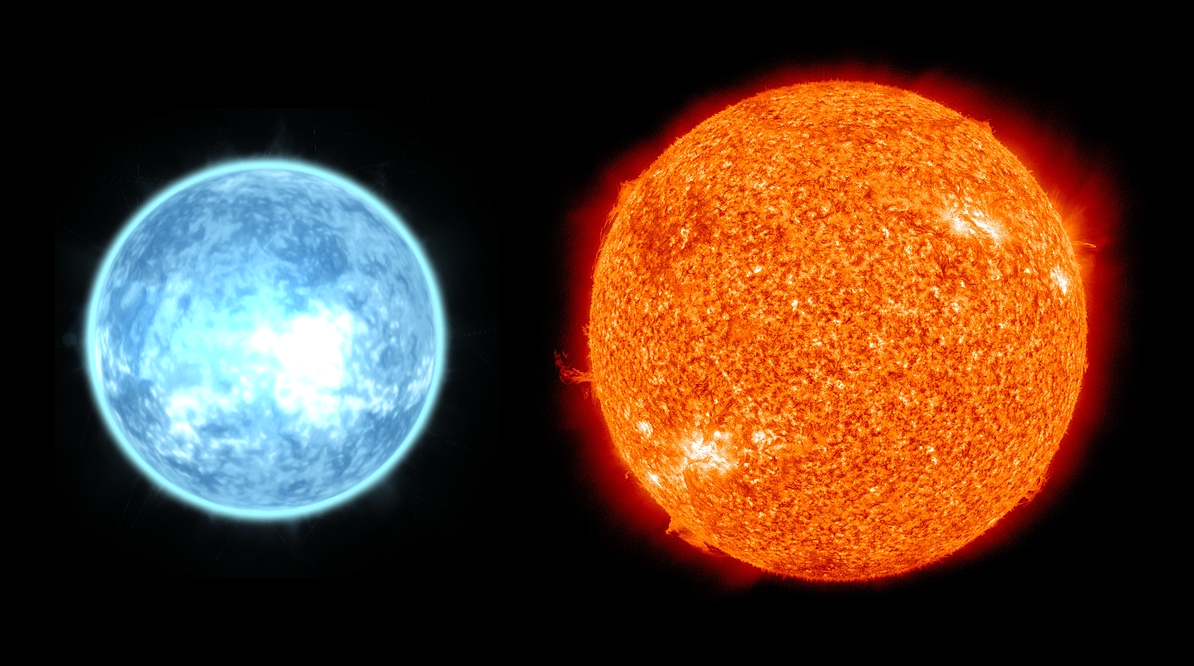
WR 102's size compared to the sun

WR 102, of spectral classification WO2, is one of the very few known oxygen-sequence Wolf–Rayet stars, just four in the Milky Way galaxy and nine in external galaxies. It is also one of the hottest known, with a surface temperature estimated to be at 210,000 K. Modelling the atmosphere gives a luminosity around 95,500 L_{☉}, while calculations from brightness and distance gives a luminosity of 380,000 L_{☉} (assuming a temperature of about 200,000 K) with a distance of 2,900±200 pc. WR 102 was likely born from the OB association Sagittarius OB5. It is a very small dense star, with a radius around 0.52 R_{☉} and a mass of 16.1 M_{☉}.

Very strong stellar winds with a terminal velocity of 5,000 kilometers per second are causing WR 102 to lose 10^{−5} M_{☉}/year. For comparison, the Sun loses (2–3) × 10^{−14} solar masses per year due to its solar wind, several hundred million times less than WR 102. These winds and the strong ultraviolet radiation from the hot star have compressed and ionised the surrounding interstellar material into a complex series of arcs described as the bubble type of Wolf–Rayet nebula.

== Evolutionary status ==
WO stars are the last evolutionary stage of the most massive stars before exploding as supernovae. It is very likely that WR 102 is on its last stages of nuclear fusion, near or beyond the end of helium burning.

It has been calculated that WR 102 will explode as a supernova within 1,500 years. High mass and rapid rotation would make a gamma-ray burst (GRB) possible, but it is unclear if WR 102 is rotating rapidly. It was previously thought that the projected rotation velocity within the stellar wind could be as fast as 1,000 km/s or around 621 miles, but spectropolarimetric observations seem to indicate that if WR 102 is rotating, it would be rotating at a much lower speed.

== See also ==
- WR 142
- WR 30a
- WR 93b
- List of supernova candidates
