= WR 142 =

Star in the constellation of Cygnus

Observation data Epoch J2000.0 Equinox ICRS
- Constellation: Cygnus
- Right ascension: 20^{h} 21^{m} 44.345^{s}
- Declination: +37° 22′ 30.56″
- Apparent magnitude (V): 12.94

Characteristics
- Evolutionary stage: Wolf–Rayet
- Spectral type: WO2
- Apparent magnitude (J): 9.538
- Apparent magnitude (H): 8.889
- Apparent magnitude (K): 8.596
- U−B color index: −0.29
- B−V color index: +1.43

Astrometry
Proper motion (μ)	RA: −6.270 mas/yr Dec.: −3.422 mas/yr
Parallax (π)	0.5755±0.0284 mas
Distance	1,650+110 −90 pc
Absolute magnitude (M_{V})	−3.13

Details
Mass	28.6 M_{☉}
Radius	0.80 R_{☉}
Luminosity (bolometric)	912,000 L_{☉}
Temperature	200,000 K
Metallicity [Fe/H]	0.0 dex
Rotational velocity (v sin i)	1,000 km/s

Other designations
- WR 142, 2MASS J20214434+3722306, GSC 02684-00001, Sand 5, St 3, UCAC2 44891902

Database references
SIMBAD	data

WR 142 is a Wolf–Rayet star in the constellation Cygnus, an extremely rare star on the WO oxygen sequence. It is a luminous and very hot star, highly evolved and close to exploding as a supernova. It is suspected to be a binary star with a companion orbiting about 1 au away.

== Discovery ==
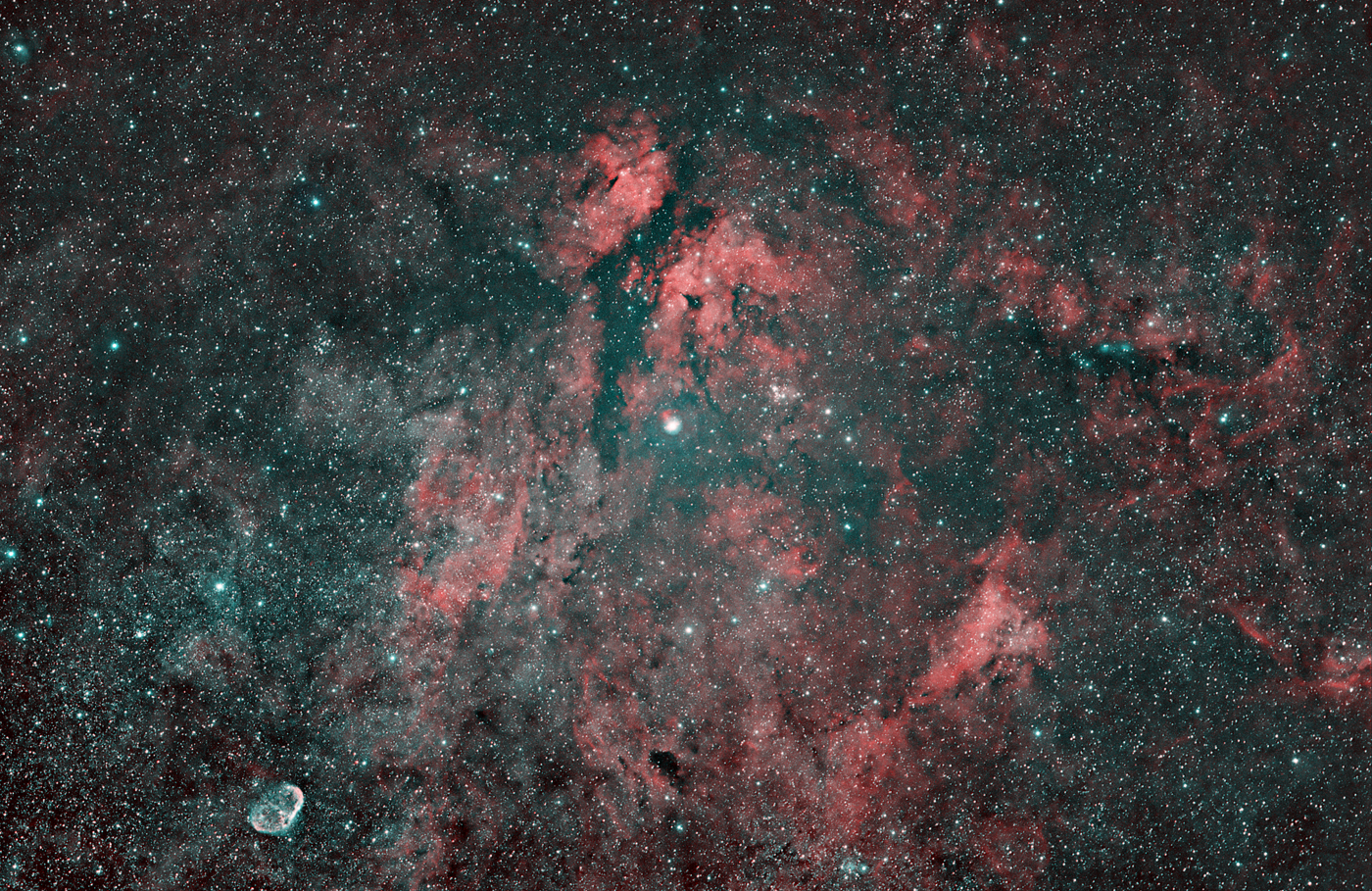
Location of WR 142, circled (the bright star at the centre is γ Cygni and north is to the right)

In 1966, a search for Wolf–Rayet stars in the northern celestial hemisphere discovered seven new examples. One, designated as Stephenson 3, was classified as WC. It was later found to show unusual emission lines of highly ionised O_{VI}. Because of the unusual oxygen lines, seen in only a handful of other stars, it was given the spectral type WC5pec in the Sixth Catalogue of Galactic Wolf–Rayet Stars.

In 1981, described as a WC-OVI star, it was identified as being associated with the active star-forming region ON2, and then a heavily obscured open cluster designated Berkeley 87, 9.5′ south of the red supergiant BC Cygni.

In 1982, the WC-OVI stars were grouped as members of the new WO class. The class at that time consisted of five stars, two of which were in the Magellanic Clouds and one of which was later found to be the central star of a planetary nebula.

== Features ==
WR 142 is usually assumed to be a member of the open cluster Berkeley 87, whose distance from the Sun is not very well known but thought to be around 1.23 kiloparsecs (4,000 light-years). As with its home cluster its light is very reddened and extinguished by interstellar dust.

This star, of spectral classification WO2, is one of the very few known oxygen-sequence Wolf–Rayet stars, just four in the Milky Way galaxy and six in external galaxies. It is also one of the hottest known with a surface temperature of 200,000 K. Modelling the atmosphere gives a luminosity around 245,000 L_{☉}, while calculations from brightness and distance give luminosities of 500,000 L_{☉} or more. According to Gaia DR2's distance, it could be as much as 912,000 L_{☉}. It is a very small dense star, with a radius of just 80% of the Sun's but a mass of nearly 29 times greater. Very strong stellar winds, with a terminal velocity of 5,000 kilometers per second are causing WR 142 to lose roughly 1.6×10^{−5} M_{☉}/year. For comparison, the Sun loses (2–3)×10^{−14} M_{☉}/year due to its solar wind, several hundred million times less than WR 142.

Hard X-ray emission has been detected from this star with the help of the Chandra space telescope, that has been suggested to be caused by the presence of a companion, a B-type main sequence star located at a distance of 1 au from WR 142. There is no other indication of a companion and other reasons for the x-ray luminosity are considered more likely.

== Evolutionary status ==
WO Wolf–Rayet stars are the last evolutionary stage of the most massive stars before exploding as supernovae, possibly with a gamma-ray burst (GRB). It is very likely that WR 142 is on its last stages of nuclear fusion, near or beyond the end of helium burning. It is estimated to explode as a supernova in approximately 2,000 years. The mass and rapid rotation make a GRB likely.

== See also ==
- WR 102
- WR 30a
- WR 93b
- List of supernova candidates
