= Hertzsprung–Russell diagram =

Scatter plot of stars showing the relationship of luminosity to stellar classification

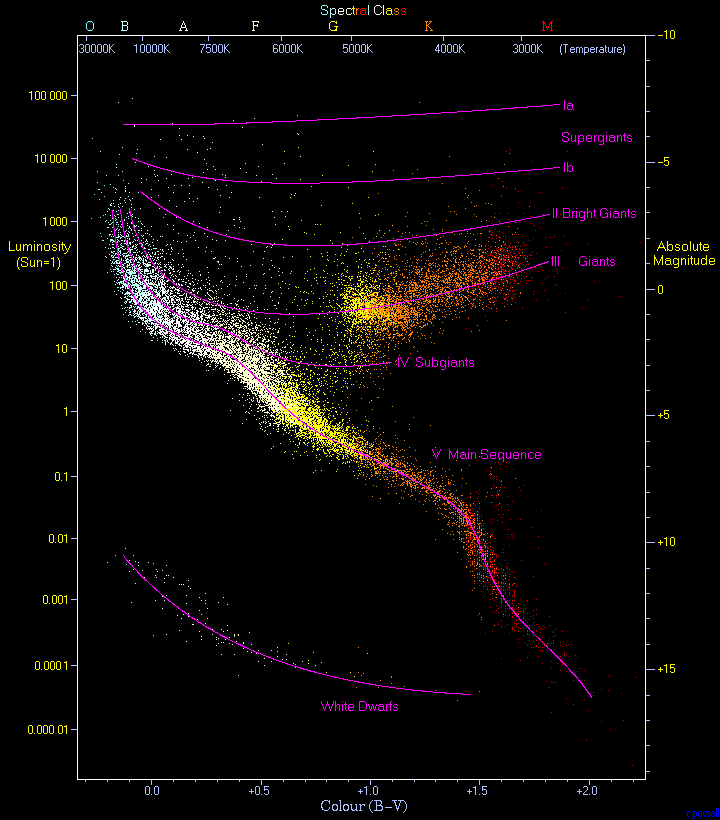
An observational Hertzsprung–Russell diagram with 22,000 stars plotted from the Hipparcos Catalogue and 1,000 from the Gliese Catalogue of nearby stars. Stars tend to fall only into certain regions of the diagram. The most prominent is the diagonal, going from the upper-left (hot and bright) to the lower-right (cooler and less bright), called the main sequence. In the lower-left is where white dwarfs are found, and above the main sequence are the subgiants, giants and supergiants. The Sun is found on the main sequence at luminosity 1 (absolute magnitude 4.8) and B−V color index 0.66 (temperature 5780 K, spectral type G2V).

A Hertzsprung–Russell diagram (abbreviated as H–R diagram, HR diagram or HRD) is a scatter plot of stars showing the relationship between the stars' absolute magnitudes or luminosities and their stellar classifications or effective temperatures. It is also sometimes called a color magnitude diagram. The diagram was created independently in 1911 by Ejnar Hertzsprung and by Henry Norris Russell in 1913, and represented a major step towards an understanding of stellar evolution.

== Historical background ==
In the nineteenth century large-scale photographic spectroscopic surveys of stars were performed at Harvard College Observatory, producing spectral classifications for tens of thousands of stars, culminating ultimately in the Henry Draper Catalogue. In one segment of this work Antonia Maury included divisions of the stars by the width of their spectral lines. Hertzsprung noted that stars described with narrow lines tended to have smaller proper motions than the others of the same spectral classification. He took this as an indication of greater luminosity for the narrow-line stars, and computed secular parallaxes for several groups of these, allowing him to estimate their absolute magnitude.

In 1910 Hans Oswald Rosenberg published a diagram plotting the apparent magnitude of stars in the Pleiades cluster against the strengths of the calcium K line and two hydrogen Balmer lines. These spectral lines serve as a proxy for the temperature of the star, an early form of spectral classification. The apparent magnitude of stars in the same cluster is equivalent to their absolute magnitude, so this early diagram was effectively a plot of luminosity against temperature. The same type of diagram is still used today as a means of showing the stars in clusters without having to initially know their distance and luminosity. Hertzsprung had already been working with this type of diagram, but his first publications showing it were not until 1911. This was also the form of the diagram using apparent magnitudes of a cluster of stars all at the same distance.

Russell's early (1913) versions of the diagram included Maury's giant stars identified by Hertzsprung, those nearby stars with parallaxes measured at the time, stars from the Hyades (a nearby open cluster), and several moving groups, for which the moving cluster method could be used to derive distances and thereby obtain absolute magnitudes for those stars.

== Forms of diagram ==
There are several forms of the Hertzsprung–Russell diagram, and the nomenclature is not very well defined. All forms share the same general layout: stars of greater luminosity are toward the top of the diagram, and stars with higher surface temperature are toward the left side of the diagram.

The original diagram displayed the spectral type of stars on the horizontal axis and the absolute visual magnitude on the vertical axis. The spectral type is not a numerical quantity, but the sequence of spectral types is a monotonic series that reflects the stellar surface temperature. Modern observational versions of the chart replace spectral type by a color index (in diagrams made in the middle of the 20th Century, most often the B-V color) of the stars. This type of diagram is what is often called an observational Hertzsprung–Russell diagram, or specifically a color–magnitude diagram (CMD), and it is often used by observers. In cases where the stars are known to be at identical distances such as within a star cluster, a color–magnitude diagram is often used to describe the stars of the cluster with a plot in which the vertical axis is the apparent magnitude of the stars. For cluster members, by assumption there is a single additive constant difference between their apparent and absolute magnitudes, called the distance modulus, for all of that cluster of stars. Early studies of nearby open clusters (like the Hyades and Pleiades) by Hertzsprung and Rosenberg produced the first CMDs, a few years before Russell's influential synthesis of the diagram collecting data for all stars for which absolute magnitudes could be determined.

Another form of the diagram plots the effective surface temperature of the star on one axis and the luminosity of the star on the other, almost invariably in a log-log plot. Theoretical calculations of stellar structure and the evolution of stars produce plots that match those from observations. This type of diagram could be called temperature-luminosity diagram, but this term is hardly ever used; when the distinction is made, this form is called the theoretical Hertzsprung–Russell diagram instead. A peculiar characteristic of this form of the H–R diagram is that the temperatures are plotted from high temperature to low temperature, which aids in comparing this form of the H–R diagram with the observational form.

Although the two types of diagrams are similar, astronomers make a sharp distinction between the two. The reason for this distinction is that the exact transformation from one to the other is not trivial. To go between effective temperature and color requires a color–temperature relation, and constructing that is difficult; it is known to be a function of stellar composition and can be affected by other factors like stellar rotation. When converting luminosity or absolute bolometric magnitude to apparent or absolute visual magnitude, one requires a bolometric correction, which may or may not come from the same source as the color–temperature relation. One also needs to know the distance to the observed objects (i.e., the distance modulus) and the effects of interstellar obscuration, both in the color (reddening) and in the apparent magnitude (where the effect is called "extinction"). Color distortion (including reddening) and extinction (obscuration) are also apparent in stars having significant circumstellar dust. The ideal of direct comparison of theoretical predictions of stellar evolution to observations thus has additional uncertainties incurred in the conversions between theoretical quantities and observations.

Since around the 1970s there is also a third version of the Hertzsprung-Russell diagram that is referred to as either the spectroscopic H-R diagram or the Kiel diagram. This presents the logarithm of the surface gravity (log g) on the y-axis, and the effective surface temperature (Teff) on the x-axis. In the spectroscopic H-R diagram, both axes are inverted such that both the surface gravity and the effective surface temperature are presented in descending order instead of ascending order. The surface gravity and the effective surface temperature are often acquired spectroscopically, i.e. by measuring and analysing stellar spectra. The data in the spectroscopic H-R diagram might not always have the exact same shape as is often seen in the CMD or the theoretical H-R diagram, but it shows similar features and shapes. Measuring spectra with good resolution requires more resources than photometric measurements, which means that this kind of diagram cannot be created for all stars if they do not have good measured spectra.

== Interpretation ==
An HR diagram with the instability strip and its components highlighted

Most of the stars occupy the region in the diagram along the line called the main sequence, with low-mass stars at the cooler and less luminous end of the sequence, and more massive stars towards the hotter and more luminous end. During the stage of their lives in which stars are found on the main sequence line, they are fusing hydrogen in their cores. A prominent group of cool stars is found at higher luminosities, and larger sizes, than main-sequence stars. These are known as red giants and include: stars fusing hydrogen around an inert helium core, the red giant branch; stars fusing helium in their cores, the horizontal branch; and stars fusing helium and hydrogen in shells around a largely-inert core, the asymptotic giant branch. The red giants are separated from the main sequence by the Hertzsprung gap, populated by subgiants and located in the region between A5 and G0 spectral type and between +1 and −3 absolute magnitudes.

Other groups of stars distinguished in the HR diagram are: supergiants, rare evolved massive stars prominent because of their high luminosity; white dwarfs, very common but with very low luminosities; and brown dwarfs, very cool and with very low luminosities. RR Lyrae variable stars are horizontal-branch stars in a section of the diagram called the instability strip. Cepheid variables also fall on the instability strip, at higher luminosities.

The H-R diagram can be used by scientists to roughly measure how far away a star cluster or galaxy is from Earth. This can be done by comparing the apparent magnitudes of the stars in the cluster to the absolute magnitudes of stars with known distances (or of model stars). The observed group is then shifted in the vertical direction, until the two main sequences overlap. The difference in magnitude that was bridged in order to match the two groups is called the distance modulus and is a direct measure for the distance (ignoring extinction). This technique is known as main sequence fitting and is a type of spectroscopic parallax. Not only the turn-off in the main sequence can be used, but also the tip of the red giant branch stars.

=== The diagram seen by ESA's Gaia mission ===
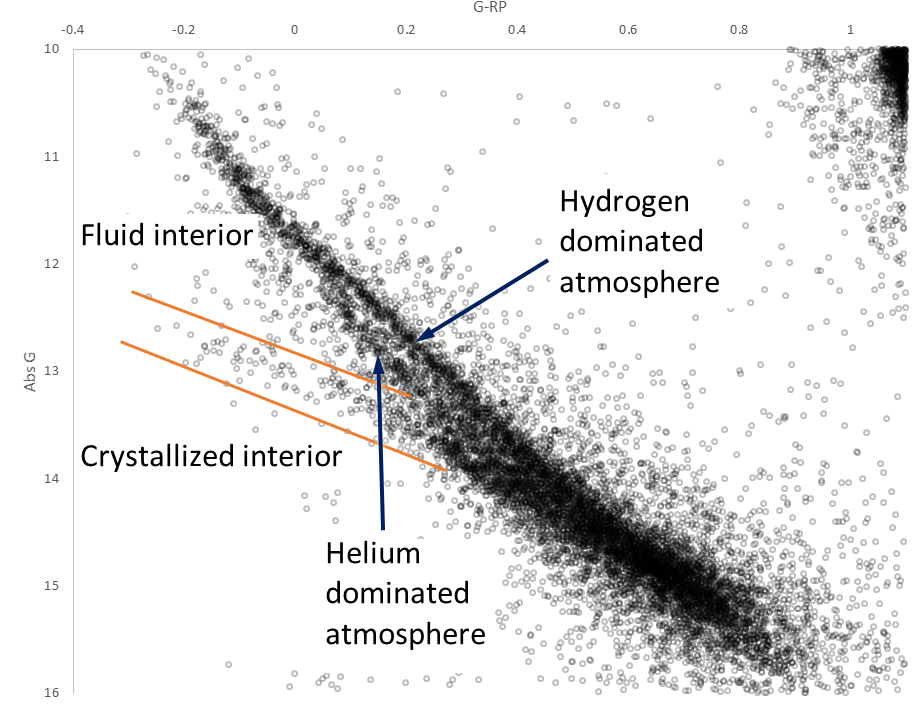
Hertzsprung-Russell diagram showing only white dwarfs with data from ESA's Gaia mission

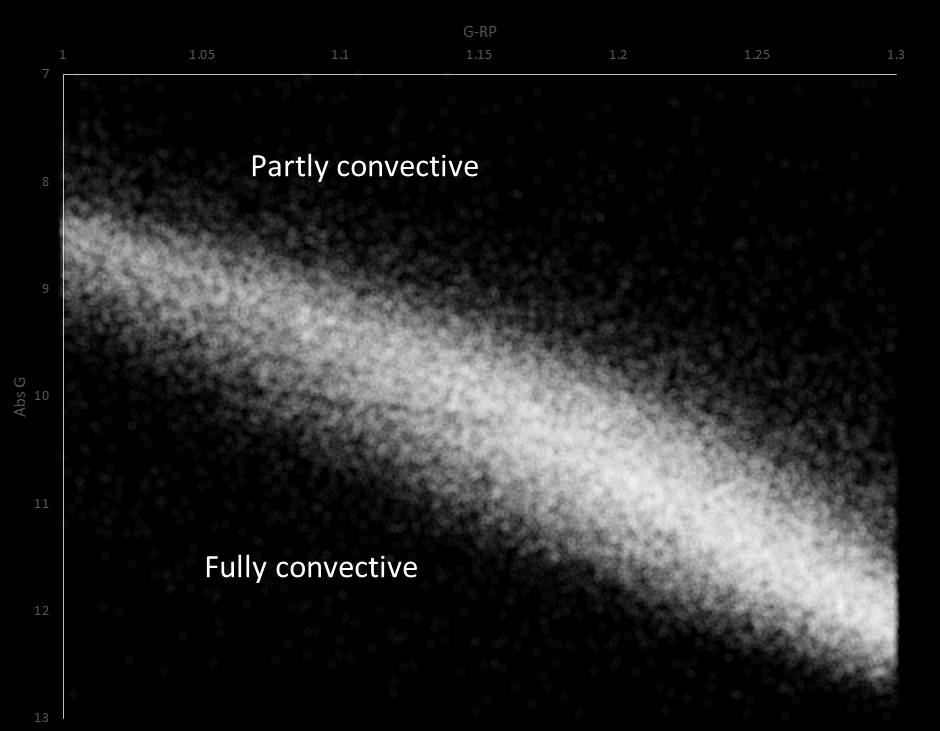
Part of the diagram from ESA's Gaia. The dark line likely represents the transition from partly convective to fully convective red dwarfs

ESA's Gaia mission showed several features in the diagram that were either not known or that were suspected to exist. It found a gap in the main sequence that appears for M-dwarfs and that is explained with the transition from a partly convective core to a fully convective core. For white dwarfs the diagram shows several features. Two main concentrations appear in this diagram following the cooling sequence of white dwarfs that are explained with the atmospheric composition of white dwarfs, especially hydrogen versus helium dominated atmospheres of white dwarfs. A third concentration is explained with core crystallization of the white dwarfs interior. This releases energy and delays the cooling of white dwarfs.

== Role in the development of stellar physics ==
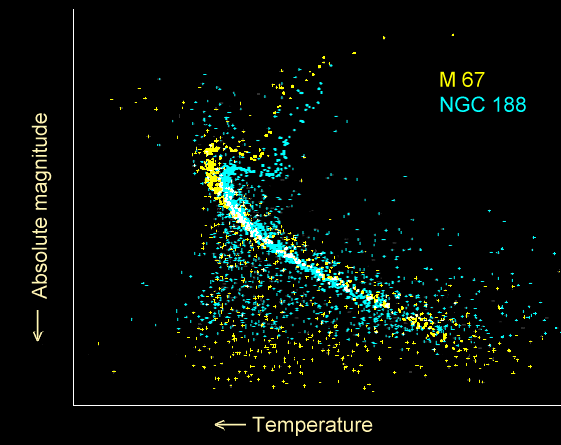
HR diagrams for two open clusters, M67 and NGC 188, showing the main sequence turn-off at different ages

Contemplation of the diagram led astronomers to speculate that it might demonstrate stellar evolution, the main suggestion being that stars collapsed from red giants to dwarf stars, then moving down along the line of the main sequence in the course of their lifetimes. Stars were thought therefore to radiate energy by converting gravitational energy into radiation through the Kelvin–Helmholtz mechanism. This mechanism resulted in an age for the Sun of only tens of millions of years, creating a conflict over the age of the Solar System between astronomers, and biologists and geologists who had evidence that the Earth was far older than that. This conflict was only resolved in the 1930s when nuclear fusion was identified as the source of stellar energy.

Following Russell's presentation of the diagram to a meeting of the Royal Astronomical Society in 1912, Arthur Eddington was inspired to use it as a basis for developing ideas on stellar physics. In 1926, in his book The Internal Constitution of the Stars he explained the physics of how stars fit on the diagram. The paper anticipated the later discovery of nuclear fusion and correctly proposed that the star's source of power was the combination of hydrogen into helium, liberating enormous energy. This was a particularly remarkable intuitive leap, since at that time the source of a star's energy was still unknown, thermonuclear energy had not been proven to exist, and even that stars are largely composed of hydrogen (see metallicity), had not yet been discovered. Eddington managed to sidestep this problem by concentrating on the thermodynamics of radiative transport of energy in stellar interiors. Eddington predicted that dwarf stars remain in an essentially static position on the main sequence for most of their lives. In the 1930s and 1940s, with an understanding of hydrogen fusion, came an evidence-backed theory of evolution to red giants following which were speculated cases of explosion and implosion of the remnants to white dwarfs. The term supernova nucleosynthesis is used to describe the creation of elements during the evolution and explosion of a pre-supernova star, a concept put forth by Fred Hoyle in 1954. The pure mathematical quantum mechanics and classical mechanical models of stellar processes enable the Hertzsprung–Russell diagram to be annotated with known conventional paths known as stellar sequences—there continue to be added rarer and more anomalous examples as more stars are analysed and mathematical models considered.

== See also ==
- Asymptotic giant branch – Grouping of evolved cool luminous stars
- Galaxy color–magnitude diagram – Chart depicting the relationship between brightness and mass of large star systems
- Hayashi track – Luminosity–temperature relationship in stars
- Henyey track – Path taken by pre-main-sequence stars in the Hertzsprung–Russell diagram
- Hess diagram – Diagram of stars in astronomy
- Red clump – Clustering of stars in astronomy diagram
- Stellar birthline – Construct in astrophysics
- Stellar isochrone – Curve on the Hertzsprung-Russell diagram representing stars of a particular age
- Stellar classification – Classification of stars based on spectral properties
- Tip of the red-giant branch – Primary distance indicator used in astronomy
- Color–color diagram – Astronomical diagram graphing two colour indices
