= Giant branch =

The giant branch is a region of the Hertzsprung–Russell diagram where giant stars are located, or the stellar evolutionary phase when stars are giants.

Giant branch may refer specifically to:

- Red-giant branch, the stellar evolutionary stage after the main sequence and before the helium flash
- Asymptotic giant branch, the stellar evolutionary stage after the horizontal branch
