= Tip of the red-giant branch =

Primary distance indicator used in astronomy

Sun-like stars have a degenerate core on the red-giant branch and ascend to the tip before starting core helium fusion with a flash.

Tip of the red-giant branch (TRGB) is a primary distance indicator used in astronomy. It uses the luminosity of the brightest red-giant-branch stars in a galaxy as a standard candle to gauge the distance to that galaxy. It has been used in conjunction with observations from the Hubble Space Telescope to determine the relative motions of the Local Cluster of galaxies within the Local Supercluster. Ground-based, 8-meter-class telescopes like the VLT are also able to measure the TRGB distance within reasonable observation times in the local universe.

== Method ==
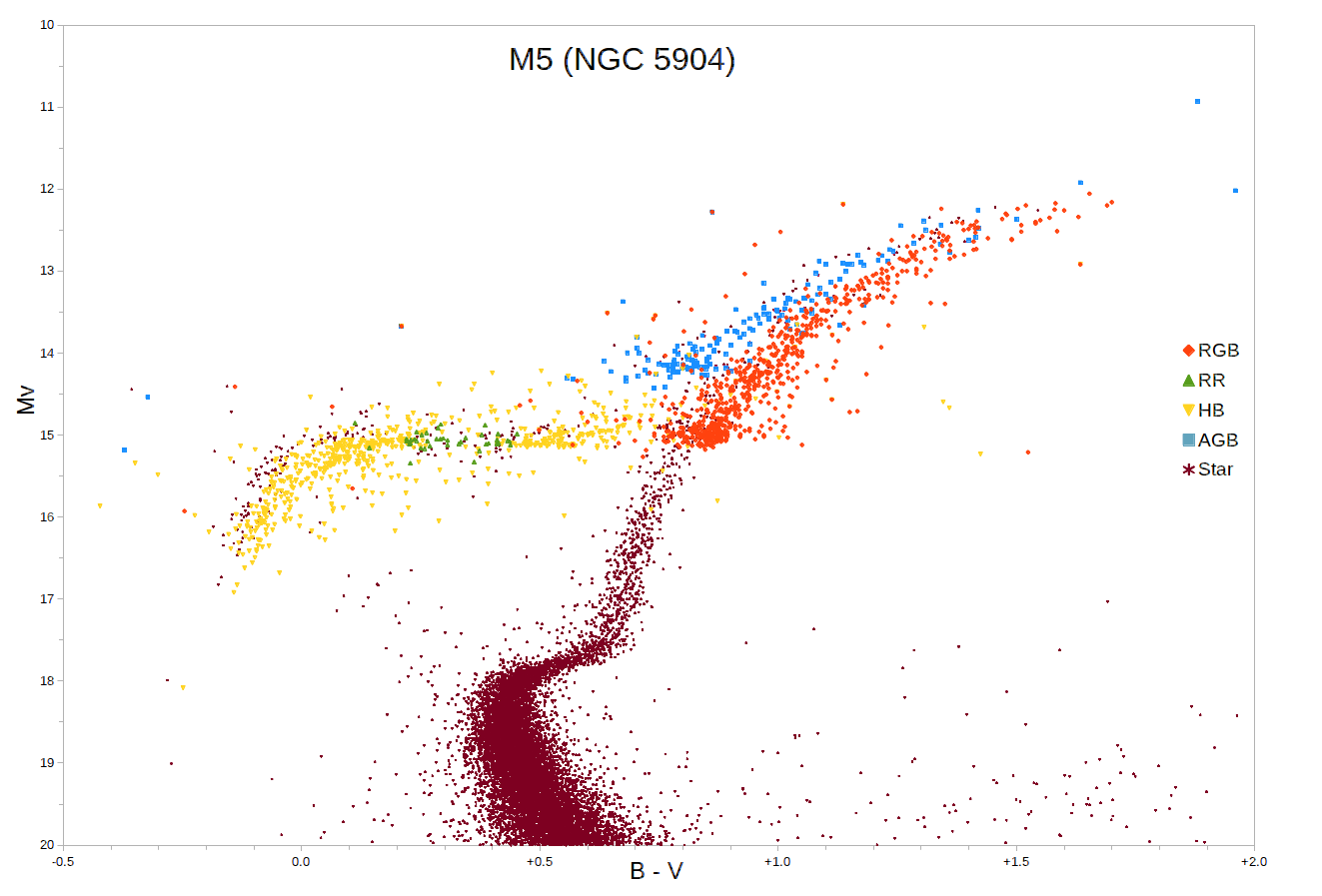
Hertzsprung–Russell diagram for globular cluster M5. The red-giant branch runs from the thin horizontal subgiant branch to the top right, with a number of the more luminous RGB stars marked in red.

The Hertzsprung–Russell diagram (HR diagram) is a plot of stellar luminosity versus surface temperature for a population of stars. During the core hydrogen burning phase of a Sun-like star's lifetime, it will appear on the HR diagram at a position along a diagonal band called the main sequence. When the hydrogen at the core is exhausted, energy will continue to be generated by hydrogen fusion in a shell around the core. The center of the star will accumulate the helium "ash" from this fusion and the star will migrate along an evolutionary branch of the HR diagram that leads toward the upper right. That is, the surface temperature will decrease and the total energy output (luminosity) of the star will increase as the surface area increases.

At a certain point, the helium at the core of the star will reach a pressure and temperature where it can begin to undergo nuclear fusion through the triple-alpha process. For a star with less than 1.8 times the mass of the Sun, this will occur in a process called the helium flash. The evolutionary track of the star will then carry it toward the left of the HR diagram as the surface temperature increases under the new equilibrium. The result is a sharp discontinuity in the evolutionary track of the star on the HR diagram. This discontinuity is called the tip of the red-giant branch.

When distant stars at the TRGB are measured in the I-band (in the infrared), their luminosity is somewhat insensitive to their composition of elements heavier than helium (metallicity) or their mass; they are a standard candle with an I-band absolute magnitude of –4.0±0.1. This makes the technique especially useful as a distance indicator. The TRGB indicator uses stars in the old stellar populations (Population II).

== See also ==
- Asymptotic giant branch
- Hess diagram
- Red clump
- Stellar classification
