= NGC 1404 =

Elliptical galaxy in the Fornax Cluster

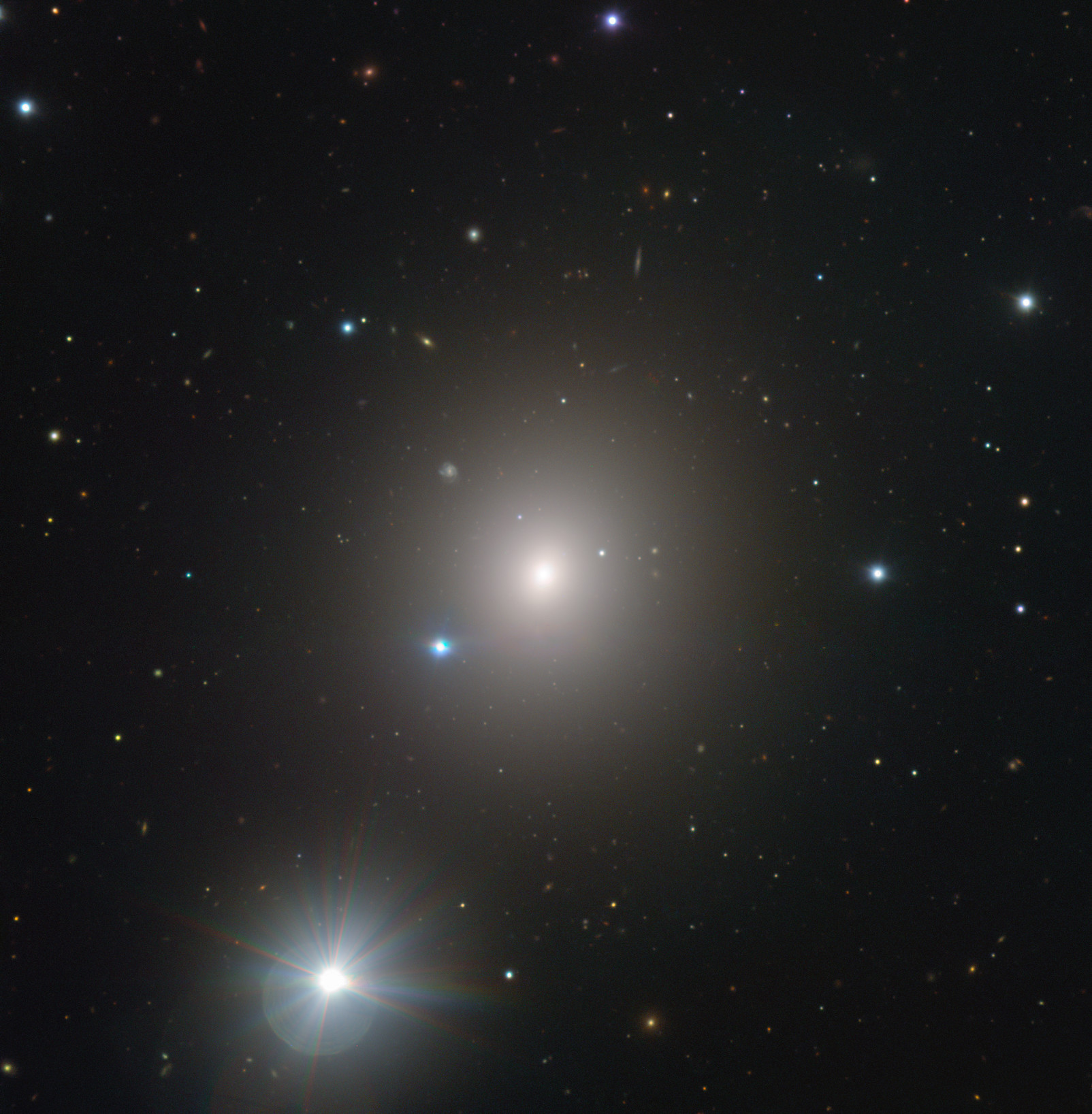
- NGC 1404 imaged by the Very Large Telescope

Observation data (J2000 epoch)
- Constellation: Eridanus
- Right ascension: 03^{h} 38^{m} 51.917^{s}
- Declination: −35° 35′ 39.81″
- Redshift: 0.006498
- Heliocentric radial velocity: 1942 ± 48 km/s
- Distance: 61 Mly (18.7 Mpc)
- Apparent magnitude (V): 10.00
- Apparent magnitude (B): 10.97

Characteristics
- Type: E1
- Apparent size (V): 3.3′ × 3.0′

Other designations
- ESO 358- G 046, 2MASX J03385191-3535398, MCG -06-09-013, PGC 13433

NGC 1404 is an elliptical galaxy in the Southern constellation Eridanus. It was discovered by British astronomer John Herschel on November 28, 1837. Based on the tip of the red-giant branch distance indicator, it lies at a distance of approximately 60 million light-years from the Milky Way. It is one of the brightest members of the Fornax Cluster.

== Characteristics ==
As usual with most elliptical galaxies, NGC 1404 is rich in globular clusters, with a population of them that has been estimated to be around 725; however it has been proposed it could have lost most of its globular clusters due to gravitational interactions with NGC 1399, the brightest galaxy of the Fornax Cluster.

Studies using the X-ray telescope Chandra show how the ram-pressure stripping caused by the motion of NGC 1404 through Fornax' intracluster medium is stripping the galaxy of its hot gas, leaving behind a large trail.

== Supernovae ==
Two supernovae have been observed in NGC 1404:

- SN 2007on (Type Ia, mag. 14.9) was discovered by Christian Pollas and the TAROT collaboration on 5 November 2007.
- SN 2011iv (Type Ia, mag. 12.8) was discovered by Stuart Parker on 2 December 2011.

== Gallery ==
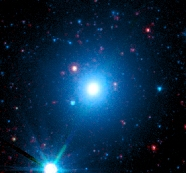
False-color image of NGC 1404 taken by the Spitzer Space Telescope
