= Hess diagram =

Diagram of stars in astronomy

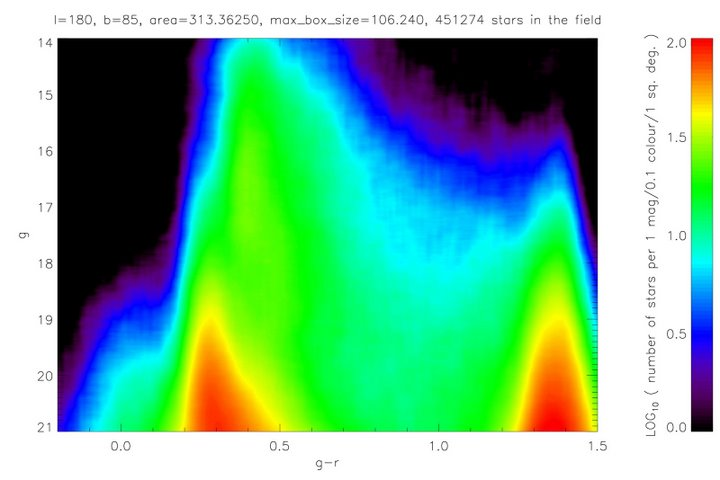
Hess diagram with data from SDSS b>80 degree

A Hess diagram plots the relative density of occurrence of stars at differing color–magnitude positions of the Hertzsprung–Russell diagram for a given galaxy or resolved stellar population. The diagram is named after R. Hess who originated it in 1924. Its use dates back to at least 1948.

Hess diagrams are widely used in the study of discrete resolved stellar systems in and around the Milky Way - specifically, in the analysis of globular clusters, satellite galaxies, and stellar streams.

== See also ==
- Color-color diagram
