= Color index =

Color of an astronomical object

Sample calibration colors
Class	B−V	U−B	V−R	R−I	T_{eff} (K)
O5V	−0.33	−1.19	−0.15	−0.32	42,000
B0V	−0.30	−1.08	−0.13	−0.29	30,000
A0V	−0.02	−0.02	0.02	−0.02	9,790
F0V	0.30	0.03	0.30	0.17	7,300
G0V	0.58	0.06	0.50	0.31	5,940
K0V	0.81	0.45	0.64	0.42	5,150
M0V	1.40	1.22	1.28	0.91	3,840

In astronomy, the color index is a simple numerical expression that determines the color of an object, which in the case of a star gives its temperature. The lower the color index, the more blue (or hotter) the object is. Conversely, the higher the color index, the more red (or cooler) the object is. This is a consequence of the inverse logarithmic magnitude scale, in which brighter objects have smaller (more negative) magnitudes than dimmer ones. For comparison, the whitish Sun has a B−V index of 0.656 ± 0.005, whereas the bluish Rigel has a B−V of −0.03 (its B magnitude is 0.09 and its V magnitude is 0.12, B−V = −0.03). Traditionally, the color index uses Vega as a zero point. The blue supergiant Theta Muscae has one of the lowest B−V indices at −0.41, while the red giant and carbon star R Leporis has one of the largest, at +5.74.

To measure the index, one observes the magnitude of an object successively through two different filters, such as U and B, or B and V, where U is sensitive to ultraviolet rays, B is sensitive to blue light, and V is sensitive to visible (green-yellow) light (see also: UBV system). The set of passbands or filters is called a photometric system. The difference in magnitudes found with these filters is called the U−B or B−V color index respectively.

In principle, the temperature of a star can be calculated directly from the B−V index, and there are several formulae to make this connection. A good approximation can be obtained by considering stars as black bodies, using Ballesteros' formula (also implemented in the PyAstronomy package for Python):

$$T = 4600\,\mathrm{K} \left( \frac{1}{0.92\;(B\text{-}\!V) + 1.7} + \frac{1}{0.92\;(B\text{-}\!V) + 0.62} \right).$$

Color indices of distant objects are usually affected by interstellar extinction, that is, they are redder than those of closer stars. The amount of reddening is characterized by color excess, defined as the difference between the observed color index and the normal color index (or intrinsic color index), the hypothetical true color index of the star, unaffected by extinction. For example, in the UBV photometric system we can write it for the B−V color:

$$E_{\text{B-}\!\text{V}} = {B\text{-}\!V}_\text{observed} - {B\text{-}\!V}_\text{intrinsic}.$$

The passbands most optical astronomers use are the UBVRI filters, where the U, B, and V filters are as mentioned above, the R filter passes red light, and the I filter passes infrared light. This system of filters is sometimes called the Johnson–Kron–Cousins filter system, named after the originators of the system (see references). These filters were specified as particular combinations of glass filters and photomultiplier tubes. M. S. Bessell specified a set of filter transmissions for a flat response detector, thus quantifying the calculation of the color indices. For precision, appropriate pairs of filters are chosen depending on the object's color temperature: B−V are for mid-range objects, U−V for hotter objects, and R−I for cool ones.

Color indices can also be determined for other celestial bodies, such as planets and moons:

Color indices of Solar System bodies
Celestial body	B-V color index	U-B color index
Mercury	0.97	0.40
Venus	0.81	0.50
Earth	0.20	0.0
Moon	0.92	0.46
Mars	1.43	0.63
Jupiter	0.87	0.48
Saturn	1.09	0.58
Uranus	0.56	0.28
Neptune	0.41	0.21

== Quantitative color index terms ==
Quantitative color index terms
Color (Vega reference)	Color index (B-V)	Spectral class (main sequence)	Spectral class (giant stars)	Spectral class (supergiant stars)	Examples
Red	≥1.40	M	K4-M9	K3-M9	Betelgeuse, Antares
Orange	0.80-1.40	K	G4-K3	G1-K2	Arcturus, Pollux
Yellow	0.60-0.80	G	G0-G3	F8-G0	Sun, Rigil Kent
Green	0.30-0.60	F	F	F4-7	Procyon
White	0.00-0.30	A	A	A0-F3	Sirius, Vega
Blue	-0.33-0.00	OB	OB	OB	Spica, Rigel

The common color labels (e.g. red supergiant) are subjective and taken using the star Vega as the reference. However, these labels, which have a quantifiable basis, do not reflect how the human eye would perceive the colors of these stars. For instance, Vega has a bluish white color, while the Sun, from outer space, would look like a neutral white somewhat warmer than the illuminant D65 (which may be considered a slightly cool white). "Green" stars would be perceived as white by the human eye.

== See also ==
- Asteroid color indices
- Color–color diagram
- Distant object color indices
- Spectral index
- UBV photometric system
- Zero point
