= Hans Oswald Rosenberg =

Hans Oswald Rosenberg (18 May 1879 – 26 July 1940) was a German astronomer. He worked in the University of Tübingen before losing his job in Nazi Germany for having Jewish descent. He then moved to the United States of America and then to Turkey. He studied correlations between spectra and magnitude and produced a precursor of the Hertzsprung-Russell Diagram in 1910 using stars at similar distances within the Pleiades cluster.

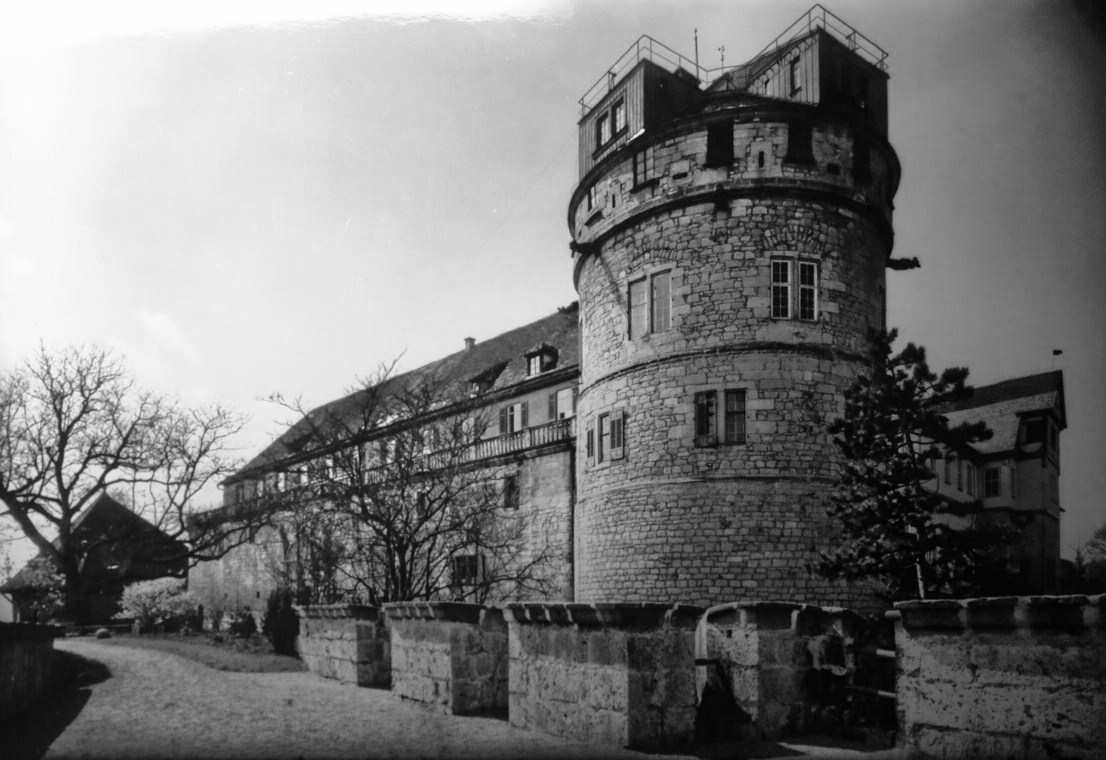
Obsolete observatory in castle

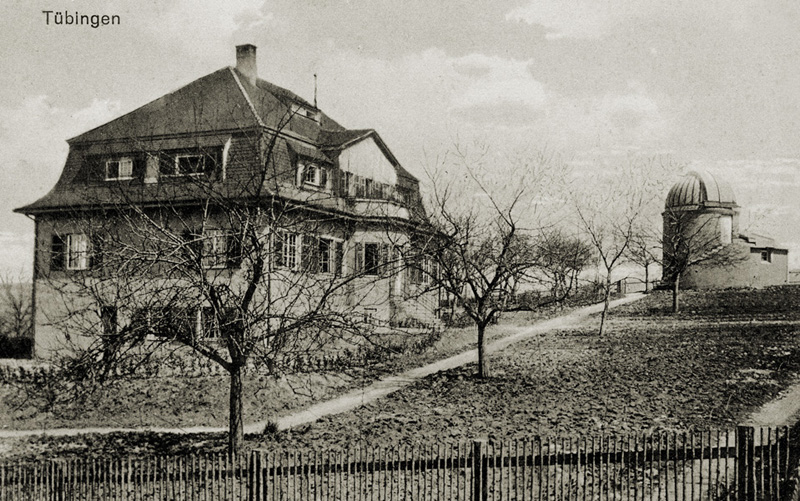
Hans Rosenbergs' observatory, Hauffstraße 20 in Tübingen

Rosenberg was born in Berlin to banker Hermann and wife Else née Dohm. Hedwig Pringsheim (1855–1942) was a maternal aunt who had married the mathematician Alfred Pringsheim. After studies at the Friedrich Wilhelm Gymnasium in Berlin, he went to study science at the Ludwig-Maximilians-Universität München (where Pringsheim was a professor) and Berlin followed by a doctorate at the University of Strasbourg under Ernst Becker studying the variable star χ Cygni. He then worked as an assistant to Karl Schwarzschild at the University of Tübingen. He became a head of the observatory there apart from teaching. He began to experiment in photometry and the measurement of star brightness using photoelectric measurements. In 1926, he became a professor at Kiel University. He went on expeditions to track total solar eclipses from Thailand and Sweden. With the rise of Nazi power, he was initially allowed to teach even though he had Jewish ancestry (the family had converted to Protestants), since he had served in World War I; however, this changed in 1933 when he was forced to take leave of absence. In 1934, he was allowed to travel to the United States where he began to teach at the University of Chicago and work at the Yerkes Observatory with Otto Struve. His position at Kiel was officially terminated in May 1935. In 1938, he immigrated to Turkey where he joined the Istanbul University, succeeding Erwin Freundlich. He worked in Istanbul until his death from heat stroke.

Rosenberg was married to Verena née Borchardt (1882-1954), the youngest sister of the poet Rudolf Borchardt. They had three sons and two daughters including Eva Maria Borer (1905-1987) who became a journalist.
