= SN 2007on =

Supernova in the constellation Eridanus

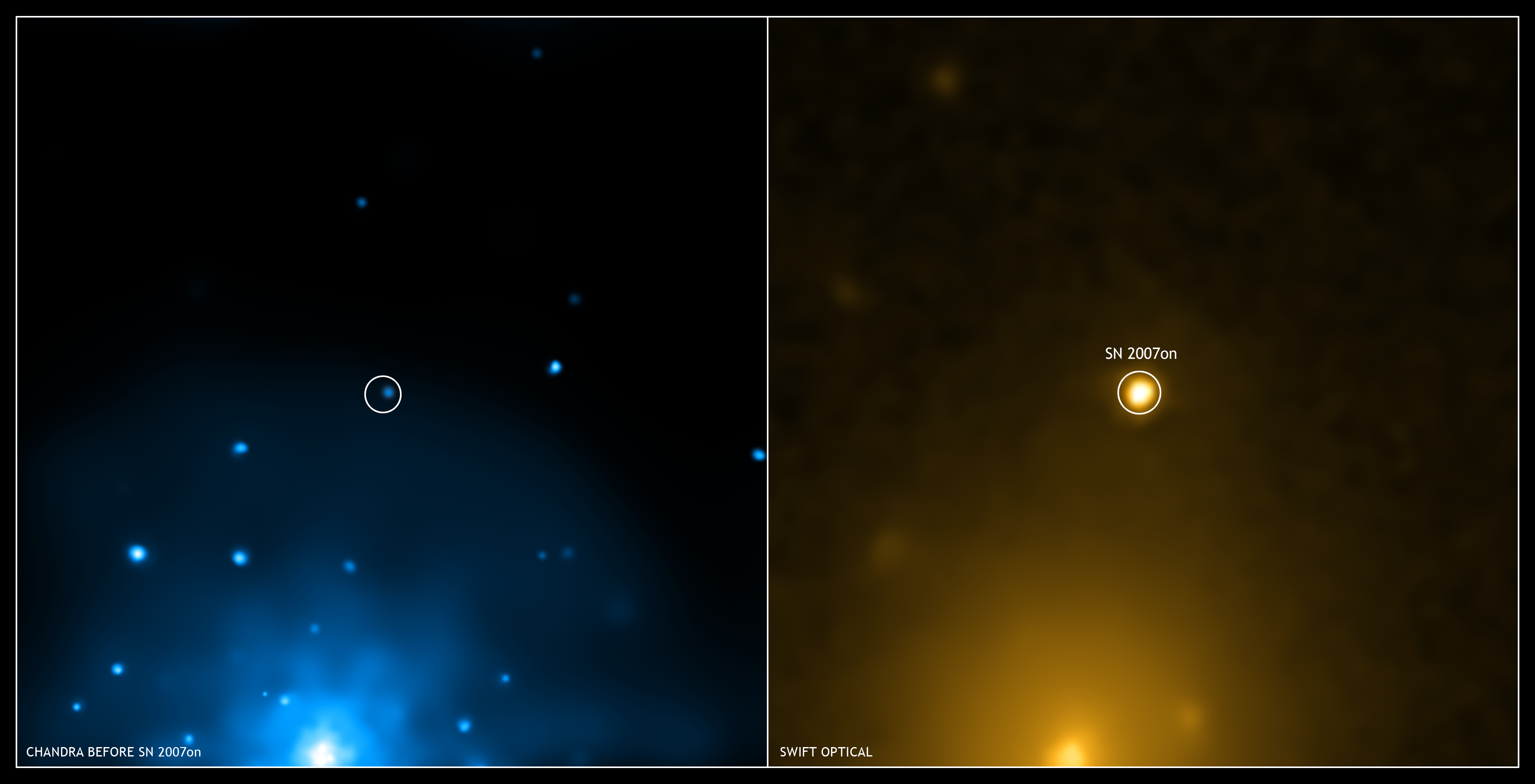
- Image of SN 2007on
- Event type: Supernova
- Type Ia
- Date: 5 November 2007
- Instrument: La Silla Observatory
- Constellation: Eridanus
- Right ascension: 03^{h} 38^{m} 50.90^{s}
- Declination: −35° 34′ 30.0″
- Epoch: J2000
- Distance: 61 Mly
- Redshift: 0.0064, 0.0062, 0.0059, 0.0075
- Host: NGC 1404
- Progenitor type: 2 White dwarf
- Other designations: SN 2007on
- Related media on Commons

SN 2007on was a Type Ia supernova that occurred in the elliptical galaxy NGC 1404, a member of the Fornax Cluster, in November 2007. It is classified as a transitional or fast-declining Type Ia supernova, intermediate in properties between normal Type Ia events and subluminous SN 1991bg supernovae. SN 2007on is notable for its extensive multi-wavelength observations and for the detection of a possible supersoft X-ray progenitor system in pre-explosion Chandra X-ray Observatory images.

== Discovery and Host Galaxy ==
SN 2007on was discovered on 5 November 2007 by the 0.25 m TAROT robotic telescope at La Silla Observatory, Chile. It was located north of the nucleus of NGC 1404. The supernova was independently reported by several surveys and received designation SN 2007on.

NGC 1404 is an elliptical galaxy in the Fornax Cluster at a distance of approximately 20 Mpc. The galaxy has an old stellar population (6–9 Gyr) and very low dust content, resulting in negligible host-galaxy reddening. The supernova exploded at a projected distance of ~8 kpc northwest of the galaxy’s center.

== Characteristics ==
Early spectra resembled those of SN 1991bg like events but with higher expansion velocities. Nebular spectra showed broad, double-peaked forbidden iron lines, suggesting a non-spherical distribution of ⁵⁶Ni. No evidence of circumstellar material or interaction was detected.
