= Absolute magnitude =

Measure of the luminosity of celestial objects

In astronomy, absolute magnitude (M) is a measure of the luminosity of a celestial object on an inverse logarithmic astronomical magnitude scale; the more luminous (intrinsically bright) an object, the lower its magnitude number. An object's absolute magnitude is defined to be equal to the apparent magnitude that the object would have if it were viewed from a distance of exactly 10 parsecs (32.6 light-years), without extinction (or dimming) of its light due to absorption by interstellar matter and cosmic dust. By hypothetically placing all objects at a standard reference distance from the observer, their luminosities can be directly compared among each other on a magnitude scale. For Solar System bodies that shine in reflected light, a different definition of absolute magnitude (H) is used, based on a standard reference distance of one astronomical unit.

Absolute magnitudes of stars generally range from approximately −10 to +20. The absolute magnitudes of galaxies can be much lower (brighter).

The more luminous an object, the smaller the numerical value of its absolute magnitude. A difference of 5 magnitudes between the absolute magnitudes of two objects corresponds to a ratio of 100 in their luminosities, and a difference of n magnitudes in absolute magnitude corresponds to a luminosity ratio of 100^{n/5}. For example, a star of absolute magnitude M_{V} = 3.0 would be 100 times as luminous as a star of absolute magnitude M_{V} = 8.0 as measured in the V filter band. The Sun has absolute magnitude M_{V} = +4.83. Highly luminous objects can have negative absolute magnitudes: for example, the Milky Way galaxy has an absolute B magnitude of about −20.8.

As with all astronomical magnitudes, the absolute magnitude can be specified for different wavelength ranges corresponding to specified filter bands or passbands; for stars a commonly quoted absolute magnitude is the absolute visual magnitude, which uses the visual (V) band of the spectrum (in the UBV photometric system). Absolute magnitudes are denoted by a capital M, with a subscript representing the filter band used for measurement, such as M_{V} for absolute magnitude in the V band.

An object's absolute bolometric magnitude (M_{bol}) represents its total luminosity over all wavelengths, rather than in a single filter band, as expressed on a logarithmic magnitude scale. To convert from an absolute magnitude in a specific filter band to absolute bolometric magnitude, a bolometric correction (BC) is applied.

== Stars and galaxies ==
In stellar and galactic astronomy, the standard distance is 10 parsecs (about 32.616 light-years, 308.57 petameters or 308.57 trillion kilometres). A star at 10 parsecs has a parallax of 0.1″ (100 milliarcseconds). Galaxies (and other extended objects) are much larger than 10 parsecs; their light is radiated over an extended patch of sky, and their overall brightness cannot be directly observed from relatively short distances, but the same convention is used. A galaxy's magnitude is defined by measuring all the light radiated over the entire object, treating that integrated brightness as the brightness of a single point-like or star-like source, and computing the magnitude of that point-like source as it would appear if observed at the standard 10 parsecs distance. Consequently, the absolute magnitude of any object equals the apparent magnitude it would have if it were 10 parsecs away.

Some stars visible to the naked eye have such a low absolute magnitude that they would appear bright enough to outshine the planets and cast shadows if they were at 10 parsecs from the Earth. Examples include Rigel (−7.8), Deneb (−8.4), Naos (−6.2), and Betelgeuse (−5.8). For comparison, Sirius has an absolute magnitude of only 1.4, which is still brighter than the Sun, whose absolute visual magnitude is 4.83. The Sun's absolute bolometric magnitude is set arbitrarily, usually at 4.75. Absolute magnitudes of stars generally range from approximately −10 to +20. The absolute magnitudes of galaxies can be much lower (brighter). For example, the giant elliptical galaxy M87 has an absolute magnitude of −22 (i.e. as bright as about 60,000 stars of magnitude −10). Some active galactic nuclei (quasars like CTA-102) can reach absolute magnitudes in excess of −32, making them the most luminous persistent objects in the observable universe, although these objects can vary in brightness over astronomically short timescales. At the extreme end, the optical afterglow of the gamma ray burst GRB 080319B reached, according to one paper, an absolute r magnitude brighter than −38 for a few tens of seconds.

=== Apparent magnitude ===
The Greek astronomer Hipparchus established a numerical scale to describe the brightness of each star appearing in the sky. The brightest stars in the sky were assigned an apparent magnitude m = 1, and the dimmest stars visible to the naked eye are assigned m = 6. The difference between them corresponds to a factor of 100 in brightness. For objects within the immediate neighborhood of the Sun, the absolute magnitude M and apparent magnitude m from any distance d (in parsecs, with 1 pc = 3.2616 light-years) are related by
$$100^{\frac{m-M}{5}}=\frac{F_{10}}{F} = \left(\frac{d}{10\;\mathrm{pc}}\right)^{2},$$
where F is the radiant flux measured at distance d (in parsecs), F_{10} the radiant flux measured at distance 10 pc. Using the common logarithm, the equation can be written as
$$M = m - 5 \log_{10}(d_\text{pc})+5 = m - 5 \left(\log_{10}d_\text{pc}-1\right),$$
where it is assumed that extinction from gas and dust is negligible. Typical extinction rates within the Milky Way galaxy are 1 to 2 magnitudes per kiloparsec, when dark clouds are taken into account.

For objects at very large distances (outside the Milky Way) the luminosity distance d_{L} (distance defined using luminosity measurements) must be used instead of d, because the Euclidean approximation is invalid for distant objects. Instead, general relativity must be taken into account. Moreover, the cosmological redshift complicates the relationship between absolute and apparent magnitude, because the radiation observed was shifted into the red range of the spectrum. To compare the magnitudes of very distant objects with those of local objects, a K correction might have to be applied to the magnitudes of the distant objects.

The absolute magnitude M can also be written in terms of the apparent magnitude m and stellar parallax p:
$$M = m + 5 \left(\log_{10}p+1\right),$$
or using apparent magnitude m and distance modulus μ:
$$M = m - \mu.$$

==== Examples ====
Rigel has a visual magnitude m_{V} of 0.12 and distance of about 860 light-years:
$$M_\mathrm{V} = 0.12 - 5 \left(\log_{10} \frac{860}{3.2616} - 1 \right) = -7.0.$$

Vega has a parallax p of 0.129″, and an apparent magnitude m_{V} of 0.03:
$$M_\mathrm{V} = 0.03 + 5 \left(\log_{10}{0.129} + 1\right) = +0.6.$$

The Black Eye Galaxy has a visual magnitude m_{V} of 9.36 and a distance modulus μ of 31.06:
$$M_\mathrm{V} = 9.36 - 31.06 = -21.7.$$

=== Bolometric magnitude ===
The absolute bolometric magnitude (M_{bol}) takes into account electromagnetic radiation at all wavelengths. It includes those unobserved due to instrumental passband, the Earth's atmospheric absorption, and extinction by interstellar dust. It is defined based on the luminosity of the stars. In the case of stars with few observations, it must be computed assuming an effective temperature.

Classically, the difference in bolometric magnitude is related to the luminosity ratio according to:
$$M_\mathrm{bol,\star} - M_\mathrm{bol,\odot} = -2.5 \log_{10} \left(\frac{L_\star}{L_\odot}\right)$$
which makes by inversion:
$$\frac{L_\star}{L_\odot} = 10^{0.4\left(M_\mathrm{bol,\odot} - M_\mathrm{bol,\star}\right)}$$
where

- L_{☉} is the Sun's luminosity (bolometric luminosity)
- L_{★} is the star's luminosity (bolometric luminosity)
- M_{bol,☉} is the bolometric magnitude of the Sun
- M_{bol,★} is the bolometric magnitude of the star.

In August 2015, the International Astronomical Union passed Resolution B2 defining the zero points of the absolute and apparent bolometric magnitude scales in SI units for power (watts) and irradiance (W/m^{2}), respectively. Although bolometric magnitudes had been used by astronomers for many decades, there had been systematic differences in the absolute magnitude-luminosity scales presented in various astronomical references, and no international standardization. This led to systematic differences in bolometric corrections scales. Combined with incorrect assumed absolute bolometric magnitudes for the Sun, this could lead to systematic errors in estimated stellar luminosities (and other stellar properties, such as radii or ages, which rely on stellar luminosity to be calculated).

Resolution B2 defines an absolute bolometric magnitude scale where M_{bol} = 0 corresponds to luminosity L_{0} = 3.0128×10^{28} W, with the zero point luminosity L_{0} set such that the Sun (with nominal luminosity 3.828×10^{26} W) corresponds to absolute bolometric magnitude M_{bol,☉} = 4.74. Placing a radiation source (e.g. star) at the standard distance of 10 parsecs, it follows that the zero point of the apparent bolometric magnitude scale m_{bol} = 0 corresponds to irradiance f_{0} = 2.518021002×10^{−8} W/m^{2}. Using the IAU 2015 scale, the nominal total solar irradiance ("solar constant") measured at 1 astronomical unit (1361 W/m^{2}) corresponds to an apparent bolometric magnitude of the Sun of m_{bol,☉} = −26.832.

Following Resolution B2, the relation between a star's absolute bolometric magnitude and its luminosity is no longer directly tied to the Sun's (variable) luminosity:
$$M_\mathrm{bol} = -2.5 \log_{10} \frac{L_\star}{L_0} \approx -2.5 \log_{10} L_\star + 71.197425$$
where

- L_{★} is the star's luminosity (bolometric luminosity) in watts
- L_{0} is the zero point luminosity 3.0128×10^{28} W
- M_{bol} is the bolometric magnitude of the star

The new IAU absolute magnitude scale permanently disconnects the scale from the variable Sun. However, on this SI power scale, the nominal solar luminosity corresponds closely to M_{bol} = 4.74, a value that was commonly adopted by astronomers before the 2015 IAU resolution.

The luminosity of the star in watts can be calculated as a function of its absolute bolometric magnitude M_{bol} as:
$$L_\star = L_0 10^{-0.4 M_\mathrm{bol}}$$
using the variables as defined previously.

== Solar System bodies (H) ==
Abs Mag (H) and Diameter for asteroids (albedo=0.14)
H	Diameter
10	36 km
12.7	10 km
15	3.6 km
17.7	1 km
19.2	510 m
20	360 m
22	140 m
22.7	100 m
24.2	51 m
25	36 m
26.6	17 m
27.7	10 m
30	3.6 m
32.7	1 m

For planets and asteroids, a definition of absolute magnitude that is more meaningful for non-stellar objects is used. The absolute magnitude, commonly called $H$, is defined as the apparent magnitude that the object would have if it were one astronomical unit (AU) from both the Sun and the observer, and in conditions of ideal solar opposition (an arrangement that is impossible in practice). Because Solar System bodies are illuminated by the Sun, their brightness varies as a function of illumination conditions, described by the phase angle. This relationship is referred to as the phase curve. The absolute magnitude is the brightness at phase angle zero, an arrangement known as opposition, from a distance of one AU. Newly discovered comets with a weakly active coma can masquerade as an asteroid resulting in unrealistic size estimates as a comet's absolute magnitude (M1) can not be directly compared to an asteroid's absolute magnitude (H).

=== Apparent magnitude ===
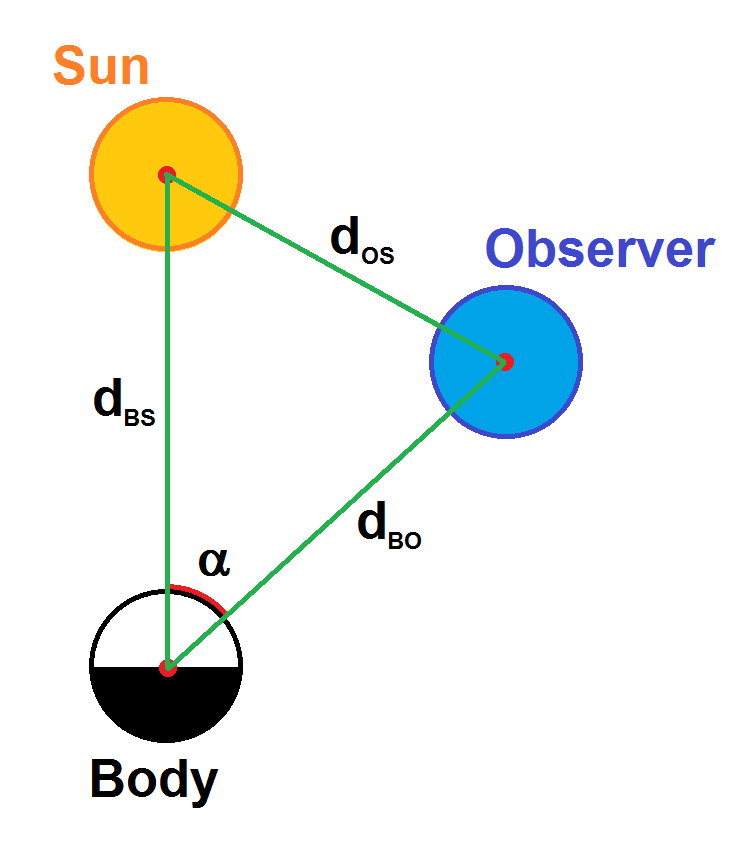
The phase angle $\alpha$ can be calculated from the distances body-sun, observer-sun and observer-body, using the law of cosines.

The absolute magnitude $H$ can be used to calculate the apparent magnitude $m$ of a body. For an object reflecting sunlight, $H$ and $m$ are connected by the relation
$$m = H + 5 \log_{10}{\left(\frac{d_{BS} d_{BO}}{d_0^2}\right)} - 2.5 \log_{10}{q(\alpha)},$$
where $\alpha$ is the phase angle, the angle between the body-Sun and body–observer lines. $q(\alpha)$ is the phase integral (the integration of reflected light; a number in the 0 to 1 range).

By the law of cosines, we have:
$$\cos{\alpha} = \frac{ d_\mathrm{BO}^2 + d_\mathrm{BS}^2 - d_\mathrm{OS}^2 } {2 d_\mathrm{BO} d_\mathrm{BS}}.$$

Distances:

- d_{BO} is the distance between the body and the observer
- d_{BS} is the distance between the body and the Sun
- d_{OS} is the distance between the observer and the Sun
- d_{0}, a unit conversion factor, is the constant 1 AU, the average distance between the Earth and the Sun

=== Approximations for phase integral q(α) ===
The value of $q(\alpha)$ depends on the properties of the reflecting surface, in particular on its roughness. In practice, different approximations are used based on the known or assumed properties of the surface. The surfaces of terrestrial planets are generally more difficult to model than those of gaseous planets, the latter of which have smoother visible surfaces.

==== Planets as diffuse spheres ====
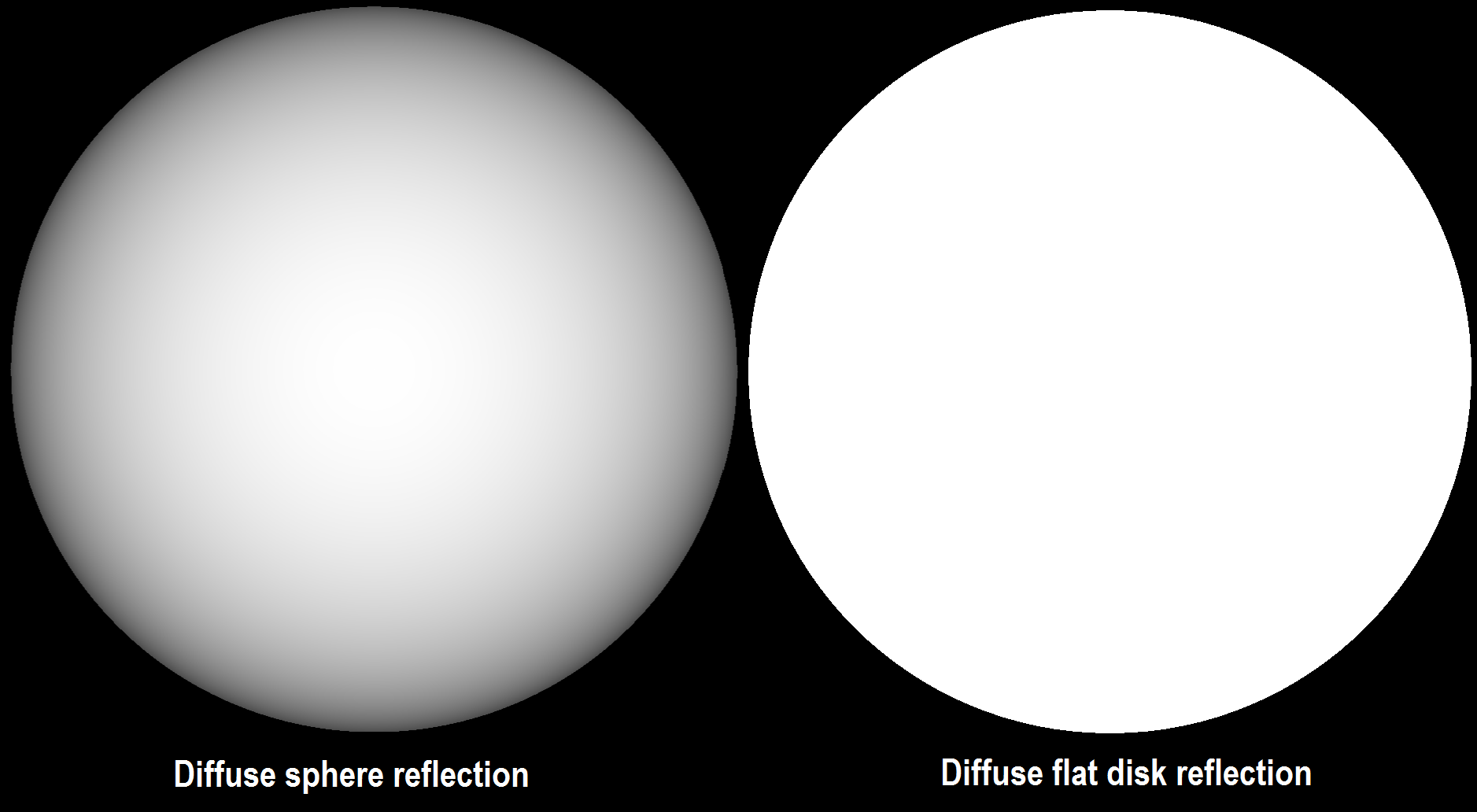
Diffuse reflection on sphere and flat disk

Brightness with phase for diffuse reflection models. The sphere is 2/3 as bright at zero phase, while the disk can't be seen beyond 90 degrees.

Planetary bodies can be approximated reasonably well as ideal diffuse reflecting spheres. Let $\alpha$ be the phase angle in degrees, then
$$q(\alpha) = \frac23 \left(\left(1-\frac{\alpha}{180^{\circ}}\right)\cos{\alpha}+\frac{1}{\pi}\sin{\alpha}\right).$$
A full-phase diffuse sphere reflects two-thirds as much light as a diffuse flat disk of the same diameter. A quarter phase ($\alpha = 90^{\circ}$) has $\frac{1}{\pi}$ as much light as full phase ($\alpha = 0^{\circ}$).

By contrast, a diffuse disk reflector model is simply $q(\alpha) = \cos{\alpha}$, which isn't realistic, but it does represent the opposition surge for rough surfaces that reflect more uniform light back at low phase angles.

The definition of the geometric albedo $p$, a measure for the reflectivity of planetary surfaces, is based on the diffuse disk reflector model. The absolute magnitude $H$, diameter $D$ (in kilometers) and geometric albedo $p$ of a body are related by (Note: The $1,329\text{ km}$ factor can be computed as $2\text{ AU}\cdot10^{H_{\text{Sun}}/5}$, where $H_{\text{Sun}}=-26.76$, the absolute magnitude of the Sun, and $1\text{ AU}=1.4959787\times10^{8}\text{ km}.$)
$$D = \frac{1329}{\sqrt{p}} \times 10^{-0.2H} \mathrm{km},$$
or equivalently,
$$H = 5\log_{10}{\frac{1329\text{ km}}{D\sqrt{p}}}.$$

Example: The Moon's absolute magnitude $H$ can be calculated from its diameter $D=3474\text{ km}$ and geometric albedo $p = 0.113$:
$$H = 5\log_{10}{\frac{1329\text{ km}}{3474\text{ km}\cdot\sqrt{0.113}}} = +0.28.$$
Cox gives a value close to that ($+0.21$).

We have $d_{BS}=1\text{ AU}$, $d_{BO}=384400\text{ km}=0.00257\text{ AU}.$ At quarter phase, $q(\alpha)\approx \frac{2}{3\pi}$ (according to the diffuse reflector model), this yields an apparent magnitude of
$$m = +0.28+5\log_{10}{\left(1\cdot0.00257\right)} - 2.5\log_{10}{\left(\frac{2}{3\pi}\right)} = -10.99.$$
The actual value is somewhat lower than that, $m=-10.0.$ This is not a good approximation, because the phase curve of the Moon is too complicated for the diffuse reflector model. A more accurate formula is given in the following section.

==== More advanced models ====
Because Solar System bodies are never perfect diffuse reflectors, astronomers use different models to predict apparent magnitudes based on known or assumed properties of the body. For planets, approximations for the correction term $-2.5\log_{10}{q(\alpha)}$ in the formula for m have been derived empirically, to match observations at different phase angles. The approximations recommended by the Astronomical Almanac are (with $\alpha$ in degrees):

Planet	Referenced calculation	$H$	Approximation for $-2.5\log_{10}{q(\alpha)}$
Mercury	−0.4	−0.613	$+6.328\times10^{-2}\alpha - 1.6336\times10^{-3}\alpha^{2}+3.3644\times10^{-5}\alpha^{3}-3.4265\times10^{-7}\alpha^{4}+1.6893\times10^{-9}\alpha^{5}-3.0334\times10^{-12}\alpha^{6}$
Venus	−4.4	−4.384	$-1.044\times10^{-3}\alpha+3.687\times10^{-4}\alpha^{2}-2.814\times10^{-6}\alpha^{3}+8.938\times10^{-9}\alpha^{4}$ (for $0^{\circ}<\alpha \le 163.7^{\circ}$); $+236.05828-2.81914\alpha+8.39034\times10^{-3}\alpha^{2}$ (for $163.7^{\circ}<\alpha<179^{\circ}$)
Earth	−	−3.99	$-1.060\times10^{-3}\alpha+2.054\times10^{-4}\alpha^{2}$
Moon	0.2	+0.21 (Note: Other sources may give slightly different values.)	$+2.9994\times10^{-2}\alpha-1.6057\times10^{-4}\alpha^{2}+3.1543\times10^{-6}\alpha^{3}-2.0667\times10^{-8}\alpha^{4}+6.2553\times10^{-11}\alpha^{5}$ (for $\alpha\le150^{\circ}$, before full Moon); $+3.3234\times10^{-2}\alpha-3.0725\times10^{-4}\alpha^{2}+6.1575\times10^{-6}\alpha^{3}-4.7723\times10^{-8}\alpha^{4}+1.4681\times10^{-10}\alpha^{5}$ (for $\alpha\le150^{\circ}$, after full Moon)
Mars	−1.5	−1.601	$+2.267\times10^{-2}\alpha-1.302\times10^{-4}\alpha^{2}$ (for $0^{\circ}<\alpha\le50^{\circ}$); $+1.234-2.573\times10^{-2}\alpha+3.445\times10^{-4}\alpha^{2}$ (for $50^{\circ}<\alpha\le120^{\circ}$)
Jupiter	−9.4	−9.395	$-3.7\times10^{-4}\alpha+6.16\times10^{-4}\alpha^{2}$ (for $\alpha\le12^{\circ}$); $-0.033-2.5\log_{10}{\left(1-1.507\left(\frac{\alpha}{180^{\circ}}\right)-0.363\left(\frac{\alpha}{180^{\circ}}\right)^{2}-0.062\left(\frac{\alpha}{180^{\circ}}\right)^{3}+2.809\left(\frac{\alpha}{180^{\circ}}\right)^{4}-1.876\left(\frac{\alpha}{180^{\circ}}\right)^{5}\right)}$ (for $\alpha>12^{\circ}$)
Saturn	−9.7	−8.914	$-1.825\sin{\left(\beta\right)}+2.6\times10^{-2}\alpha-0.378\sin{\left(\beta\right)}e^{-2.25\alpha}$ (for planet and rings, $\alpha<6.5^{\circ}$ and $\beta<27^{\circ}$); $-0.036-3.7\times10^{-4}\alpha+6.16\times10^{-4}\alpha^{2}$ (for the globe alone, $\alpha\le6^{\circ}$); $+0.026+2.446\times10^{-4}\alpha+2.672\times10^{-4}\alpha^{2}-1.505\times10^{-6}\alpha^{3}+4.767\times10^{-9}\alpha^{4}$ (for the globe alone, $6^{\circ}<\alpha<150^{\circ}$)
Uranus	−7.2	−7.110	$-8.4\times10^{-4}\phi'+6.587\times10^{-3}\alpha+1.045\times10^{-4}\alpha^{2}$ (for $\alpha < 3.1^{\circ}$)
Neptune	−6.9	−7.00	$+7.944\times10^{-3}\alpha+9.617\times10^{-5}\alpha^{2}$ (for $\alpha < 133^{\circ}$ and $t > 2000.0$)

The different halves of the Moon, as seen from Earth

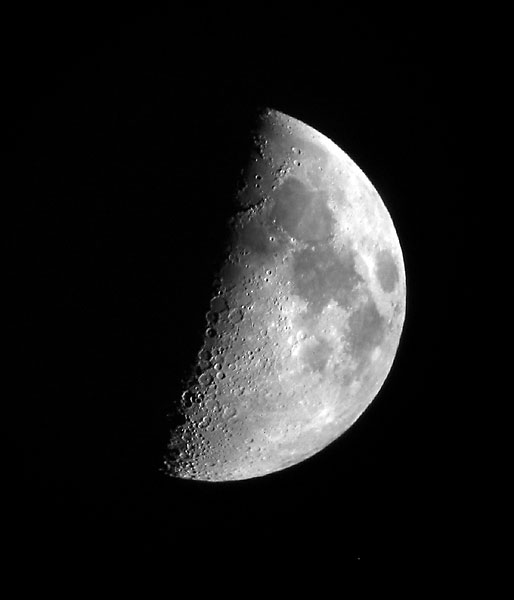
Moon at first quarter

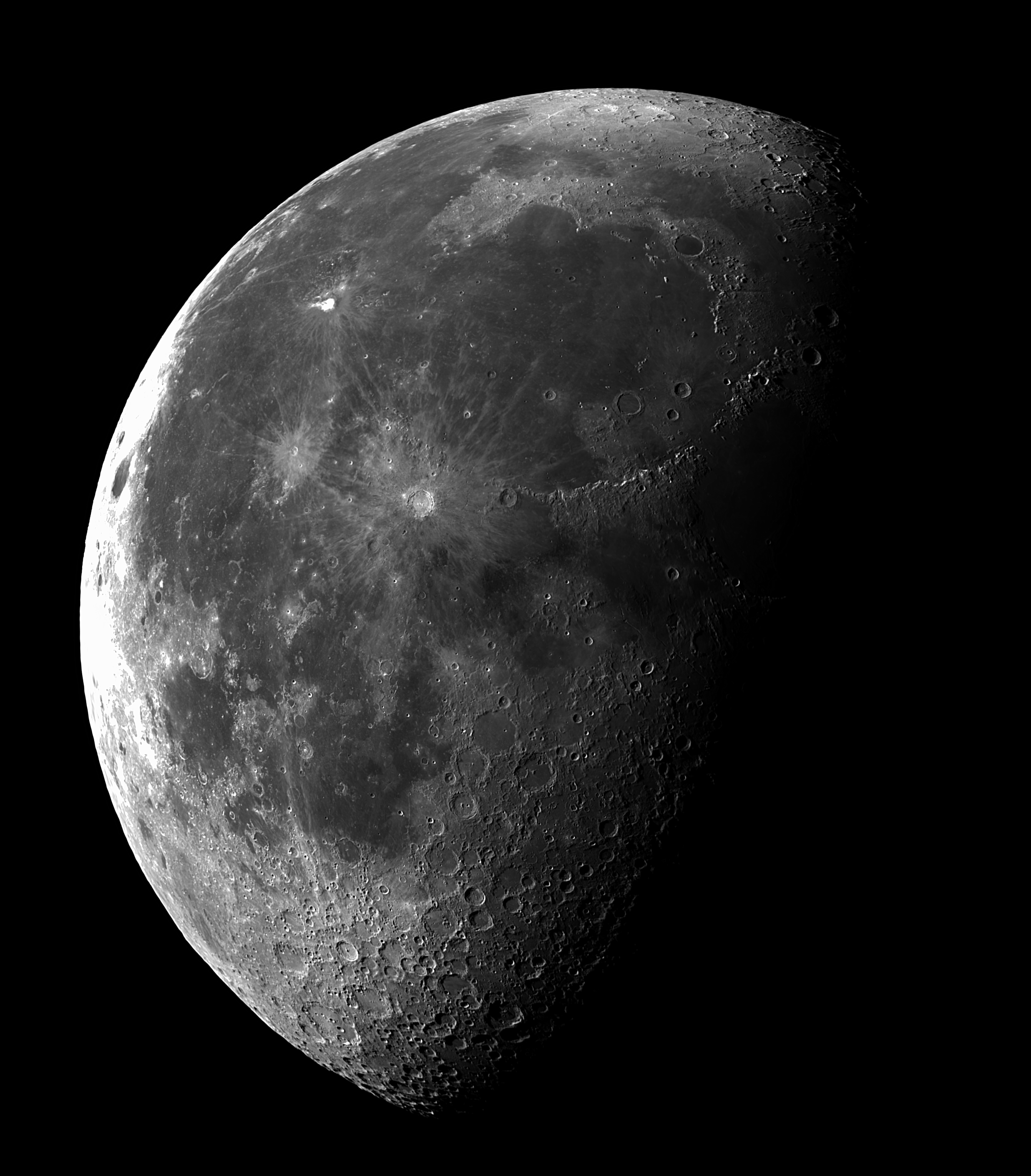
Moon at last quarter

Here $\beta$ is the effective inclination of Saturn's rings (their tilt relative to the observer), which as seen from Earth varies between 0° and 27° over the course of one Saturn orbit, and $\phi'$ is a small correction term depending on Uranus' sub-Earth and sub-solar latitudes. $t$ is the Common Era year. Neptune's absolute magnitude is changing slowly due to seasonal effects as the planet moves along its 165-year orbit around the Sun, and the approximation above is only valid after the year 2000. For some circumstances, like $\alpha \ge 179^{\circ}$ for Venus, no observations are available, and the phase curve is unknown in those cases. The formula for the Moon is only applicable to the near side of the Moon, the portion that is visible from the Earth.

Example 1: On 1 January 2019, Venus was $d_{BS}=0.719\text{ AU}$ from the Sun, and $d_{BO} = 0.645\text{ AU}$ from Earth, at a phase angle of $\alpha=93.0^{\circ}$ (near quarter phase). Under full-phase conditions, Venus would have been visible at $m=-4.384+5\log_{10}{\left(0.719 \cdot 0.645\right)}=-6.09.$ Accounting for the high phase angle, the correction term above yields an actual apparent magnitude of
$$m = -6.09 + \left(-1.044 \times 10^{-3} \cdot 93.0 + 3.687\times10^{-4} \cdot 93.0^{2} - 2.814 \times 10^{-6} \cdot 93.0^{3} + 8.938 \times 10^{-9} \cdot 93.0^{4}\right) = -4.59.$$
This is close to the value of $m=-4.62$ predicted by the Jet Propulsion Laboratory.

Example 2: At first quarter phase, the approximation for the Moon gives $-2.5\log_{10}{q(90^{\circ})}=2.71.$ With that, the apparent magnitude of the Moon is $m = +0.21+5\log_{10}{\left(1\cdot0.00257\right)}+2.71= -10.03,$ close to the expected value of about $-10.0$. At last quarter, the Moon is about 0.06 mag fainter than at first quarter, because that part of its surface has a lower albedo. (Note: Calculation: Using the phase function at $\alpha=90^{\circ}$ in Cox, table 12.15, gives $2.5\cdot\log_{10}{0.0824/0.0780}=0.0596\text{ mag}$.)

Earth's albedo varies by a factor of 6, from 0.12 in the cloud-free case to 0.76 in the case of altostratus cloud. The absolute magnitude in the table corresponds to an albedo of 0.434. Due to the variability of the weather, Earth's apparent magnitude cannot be predicted as accurately as that of most other planets.

==== Asteroids ====
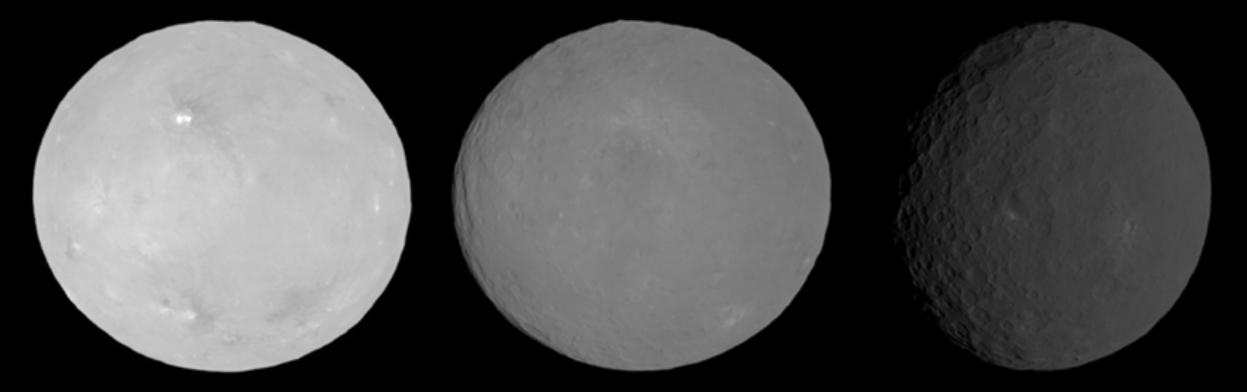
Asteroid 1 Ceres, imaged by the Dawn spacecraft at phase angles of 0°, 7° and 33°. The strong difference in brightness between the three is real. The left image at 0° phase angle shows the brightness surge due to the opposition effect.

Phase integrals for various values of G

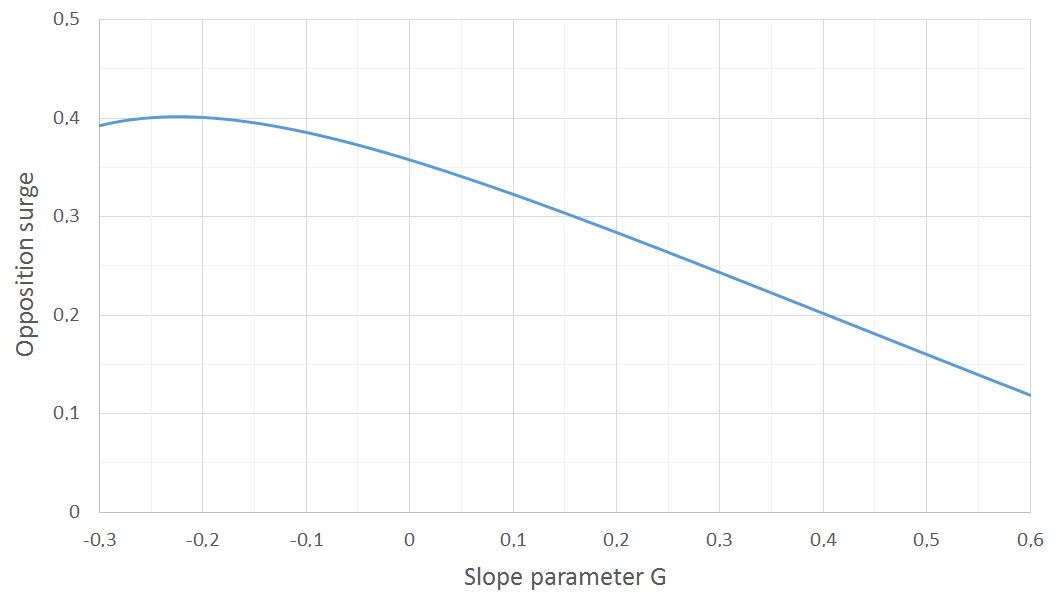
Relationship between the slope parameter $G$ and the opposition surge. Larger values of $G$ correspond to a less pronounced opposition effect. For most asteroids, a value of $G = 0.15$ is assumed, corresponding to an opposition surge of $0.3\text{ mag}$.

If an object has an atmosphere, it reflects light more or less isotropically in all directions, and its brightness can be modelled as a diffuse reflector. Bodies with no atmosphere, like asteroids or moons, tend to reflect light more strongly to the direction of the incident light, and their brightness increases rapidly as the phase angle approaches $0^{\circ}$. This rapid brightening near opposition is called the opposition effect. Its strength depends on the physical properties of the body's surface, and hence it differs from asteroid to asteroid.

In 1985, the IAU adopted the semi-empirical $HG$-system, based on two parameters $H$ and $G$ called absolute magnitude and slope, to model the opposition effect for the ephemerides published by the Minor Planet Center.
$$m = H + 5\log_{10}{\left(\frac{d_{BS}d_{BO}}{d_{0}^{2}}\right)}-2.5\log_{10}{q(\alpha)},$$

where

- the phase integral is $q(\alpha)=\left(1-G\right)\phi_{1}\left(\alpha\right)+G\phi_{2}\left(\alpha\right)$ and
- $\phi_{i}\left(\alpha\right) = \exp{\left(-A_i \left(\tan{\frac{\alpha}{2}}\right)^{B_i}\right)}$ for $i = 1$ or $2$, $A_{1}=3.332$, $A_{2}=1.862$, $B_{1}=0.631$ and $B_2 = 1.218$.

This relation is valid for phase angles $\alpha < 120^{\circ}$, and works best when $\alpha < 20^{\circ}$.

The slope parameter $G$ relates to the surge in brightness, typically 0.3 mag, when the object is near opposition. It is known accurately only for a small number of asteroids, hence for most asteroids a value of $G=0.15$ is assumed. In rare cases, $G$ can be negative. An example is 101955 Bennu, with $G=-0.03$.

In 2012, the $HG$-system was officially replaced by an improved system with three parameters $H$, $G_1$ and $G_2$, which produces more satisfactory results if the opposition effect is very small or restricted to very small phase angles. However, as of 2022, this $H G_1 G_2$-system has not been adopted by either the Minor Planet Center nor Jet Propulsion Laboratory.

The apparent magnitude of asteroids varies as they rotate, on time scales of seconds to weeks depending on their rotation period, by up to $2\text{ mag}$ or more. In addition, their absolute magnitude can vary with the viewing direction, depending on their axial tilt. In many cases, neither the rotation period nor the axial tilt are known, limiting the predictability. The models presented here do not capture those effects.

=== Cometary magnitudes ===
The brightness of comets is given separately as total magnitude ($m_{1}$, the brightness integrated over the entire visible extent of the coma) and nuclear magnitude ($m_{2}$, the brightness of the core region alone). Both are different scales than the magnitude scale used for planets and asteroids, and can not be used for a size comparison with an asteroid's absolute magnitude H.

The activity of comets varies with their distance from the Sun. Their brightness can be approximated as
$$m_{1} = M_{1} + 2.5\cdot K_{1}\log_{10}{\left(\frac{d_{BS}}{d_0}\right)} + 5\log_{10}{\left(\frac{d_{BO}}{d_0}\right)}$$
$$m_{2} = M_{2} + 2.5\cdot K_{2}\log_{10}{\left(\frac{d_{BS}}{d_0}\right)} + 5\log_{10}{\left(\frac{d_{BO}}{d_0}\right)},$$
where $m_{1,2}$ are the total and nuclear apparent magnitudes of the comet, respectively, $M_{1,2}$ are its "absolute" total and nuclear magnitudes, $d_{BS}$ and $d_{BO}$ are the body-sun and body-observer distances, $d_{0}$ is the Astronomical Unit, and $K_{1,2}$ are the slope parameters characterising the comet's activity. For $K=2$, this reduces to the formula for a purely reflecting body (showing no cometary activity).

For example, the lightcurve of comet C/2011 L4 (PANSTARRS) can be approximated by $M_{1}=5.5\text{, }K_{1}=3.7$. On the day of its perihelion passage, 10 March 2013, comet PANSTARRS was $0.302\text{ AU}$ from the Sun and $1.109\text{ AU}$ from Earth. The total apparent magnitude $m_{1}$ is predicted to have been $m_1 = 5.5 + 2.5\cdot3.7\cdot\log_{10}{\left(0.302\right)}+5\log_{10}{\left(1.109\right)} = +0.9$ at that time. The Minor Planet Center gives a value close to that, $m_{1} = +0.5$.

Absolute magnitudes and sizes of comet nuclei
Comet	Absolute magnitude $M_{1}$	Nucleus diameter
Comet Sarabat	−3.0	≈100 km?
Comet Hale-Bopp	−1.3	60 ± 20 km
Comet Halley	4.0	14.9 x 8.2 km
average new comet	6.5	≈2 km
C/2014 UN_{271} (Bernardinelli-Bernstein)	6.2±0.9	119 to 137 km
289P/Blanpain (during 1819 outburst)	8.5	320 m
289P/Blanpain (normal activity)	22.9	320 m

The absolute magnitude of any given comet can vary dramatically. It can change as the comet becomes more or less active over time or if it undergoes an outburst. This makes it difficult to use the absolute magnitude for a size estimate. When comet 289P/Blanpain was discovered in 1819, its absolute magnitude was estimated as $M_{1} = 8.5$. It was subsequently lost and was only rediscovered in 2003. At that time, its absolute magnitude had decreased to $M_{1} = 22.9$, and it was realised that the 1819 apparition coincided with an outburst. 289P/Blanpain reached naked eye brightness (5–8 mag) in 1819, even though it is the comet with the smallest nucleus that has ever been physically characterised, and usually doesn't become brighter than 18 mag.

For some comets that have been observed at heliocentric distances large enough to distinguish between light reflected from the coma, and light from the nucleus itself, an absolute magnitude analogous to that used for asteroids has been calculated, allowing to estimate the sizes of their nuclei.

== Meteors ==
For a meteor, the standard distance for measurement of magnitudes is at an altitude of 100 km (62 mi) at the observer's zenith.

== See also ==
- Araucaria Project
- Hertzsprung–Russell diagram – relates absolute magnitude or luminosity versus spectral color or surface temperature.
- Jansky - the preferred unit for radio astronomy – linear in power/unit area
- List of most luminous stars
- Photographic magnitude
- Surface brightness – the magnitude for extended objects
- Zero point (photometry) – the typical calibration point for star flux
