= Bolometric correction =

Calculation in astronomy

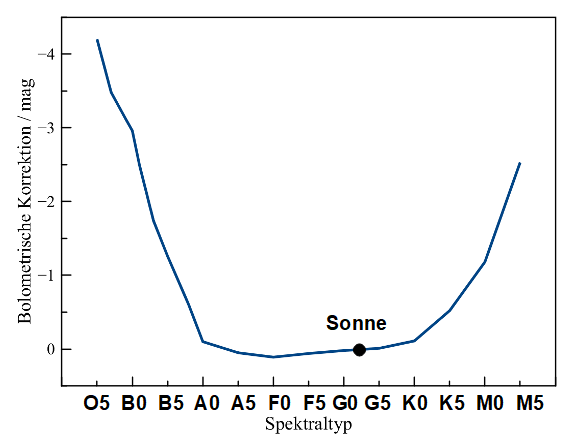
The bolometric correction as a function of spectral type

In astronomy, the bolometric correction is the correction made to the absolute visual magnitude of an object in order to convert it to an absolute bolometric magnitude. It is large for stars which radiate most of their energy outside of the visible range. A uniform scale for the correction has not yet been standardized.

== Description ==
Mathematically, such a calculation can be expressed:
$$BC = M_\text{bol} - M_v$$

The bolometric correction for a range of stars with different spectral types and groups is shown in the following table:

Spectral type	Main Sequence	Giants	Supergiants
O3	−4.3	−4.2	−4.0
G0	−0.10	−0.13	−0.1
G5	−0.14	−0.34	−0.20
K0	−0.24	−0.42	−0.38
K5	−0.66	−1.19	−1.00
M0	−1.21	−1.28	−1.3

The bolometric correction is large and negative both for early type (hot) stars and for late type (cool) stars. The former because a substantial part of the produced radiation is in the ultraviolet, the latter because a large part is in the infrared. For a star like the Sun, the correction is only marginal because the Sun radiates most of its energy in the visual wavelength range. Bolometric correction is the correction made to the absolute magnitude of an object in order to convert an object's visible magnitude to its bolometric magnitude.

Alternatively, the bolometric correction can be made to absolute magnitudes based on other wavelength bands beyond the visible electromagnetic spectrum. For example, and somewhat more commonly for those cooler stars where most of the energy is emitted in the infrared wavelength range, sometimes a different value set of bolometric corrections is applied to the absolute infrared magnitude, instead of the absolute visual magnitude.

Mathematically, such a calculation could be expressed:

$$BC_K = M_\text{bol} - M_k$$
Where M_{K} is the absolute magnitude value and BC_{K} is the bolometric correction value in the K-band.

== Setting the correction scale ==
The bolometric correction scale is set by the absolute magnitude of the Sun and an adopted (arbitrary) absolute bolometric magnitude for the Sun. Hence, while the absolute magnitude of the Sun in different filters is a physical and not arbitrary quantity, the absolute bolometric magnitude of the Sun is arbitrary, and so the zero-point of the bolometric correction scale that follows from it. This explains why classic references have tabulated apparently mutually incompatible values for these quantities. The bolometric scale historically had varied somewhat in the literature, with the Sun's bolometric correction in V-band varying from -0.19 to -0.07 magnitude. It follows that any value for the absolute bolometric magnitude of the Sun is legitimate, on the condition that once chosen all bolometric corrections are rescaled accordingly. If not, this will induce systematic errors in the determination of stellar luminosities.

The XXIXth International Astronomical Union (IAU) General Assembly in Honolulu adopted in August 2015 Resolution B2 on recommended zero points for the absolute and apparent bolometric magnitude scales.

Although bolometric magnitudes have been in use for over eight decades, there have been systematic differences in the absolute magnitude-luminosity scales presented in various astronomical references with no international standardization. This has led to systematic differences in bolometric correction scales. When combined with incorrect assumed absolute bolometric magnitudes for the Sun this can lead to systematic errors in estimated stellar luminosities. Many stellar properties are calculated based on stellar luminosity, such as radii, ages, etc.

IAU 2015 Resolution B2 proposed an absolute bolometric magnitude scale where $M_\text{bol} = 0$ corresponds to luminosity 3.0128×10^{28} W, with the zero point luminosity chosen such that the Sun (with nominal luminosity 3.828×10^{26} W) corresponds to absolute bolometric magnitude $M_{\text{bol}_{\rm Sun}} = 4.74$. Placing a radiation source (e.g. star) at the standard distance of 10 parsecs, it follows that the zero point of the apparent bolometric magnitude scale $m_\text{bol} = 0$ corresponds to irradiance $f_{o} = 2.518 021 002... \times 10^{-8} \mathrm{ W/m^2}$, where the nominal total solar irradiance measured at 1 astronomical unit (1361 W/m^{2}) corresponds to an apparent bolometric magnitude of the Sun of $m_{\text{bol}_{\rm Sun}} = -26.832$.

A similar IAU proposal in 1999 (with a slightly different zero point, tied to an obsolete solar luminosity estimate) was adopted by IAU Commissions 25 and 36. However it never reached a General Assembly vote, and subsequently was only adopted sporadically by astronomers in the literature.

== See also ==
- Absolute magnitude
- K band (infrared)
- V band
