= HD 283572 =

Young star in constellation Taurus

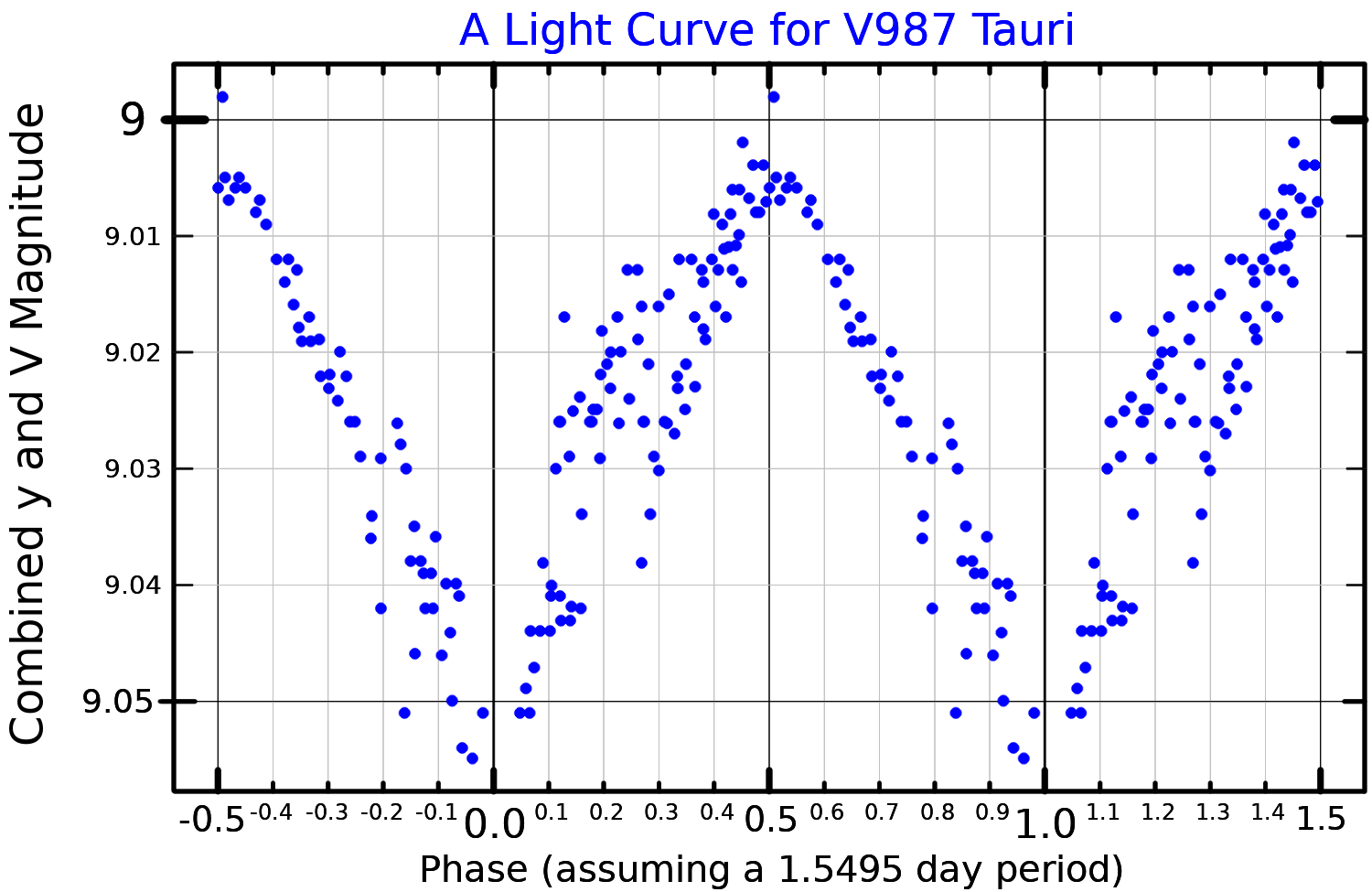
- A combined y band (near-infrared) and visual band light curve for V987 Tauri, adapted from Strassmeier and Rice (1998)

Observation data Epoch J2000 Equinox ICRS
- Constellation: Taurus
- Right ascension: 04^{h} 21^{m} 58.8485^{s}
- Declination: +28° 18′ 06.513″
- Apparent magnitude (V): 8.87 – 9.1

Characteristics
- Evolutionary stage: pre-main-sequence star
- Spectral type: G5
- Apparent magnitude (B): 9.80
- Apparent magnitude (G): 8.80
- Apparent magnitude (R): 9.14
- Apparent magnitude (J): 7.414
- Variable type: T Tau

Astrometry
Radial velocity (R_{v})	15.0±1.5 km/s
Proper motion (μ)	RA: 8.837±0.027 mas/yr Dec.: −26.426±0.017 mas/yr
Parallax (π)	7.8735±0.0190 mas
Distance	414.2 ± 1.0 ly (127.0 ± 0.3 pc)

Details
Mass	1.6 M_{☉}
Radius	2.2 R_{☉}
Luminosity	5.5 L_{☉}
Temperature	5,770 K
Metallicity [Fe/H]	0.7±0.2 dex
Rotation	1.55 d
Rotational velocity (v sin i)	78 km/s
Age	9 Myr

Other designations
- V987 Tauri, BD+27 657, HD 283572, HIP 20388, TYC 1828-481-1, GSC 01828-00481, 2MASS J04215884+2818066

Database references
SIMBAD	data

HD 283572 is a young T Tauri-type pre-main sequence star in the constellation of Taurus about 414 light years away, belonging to the Taurus Molecular Cloud. It is a rather evolved protostar which already dispersed its birth shroud. The star emits a very high X-ray flux of 10^{31} ergs/s. That radiation flux associated with the magnetic activity induced a high coronal temperature of 3 keV and regular flares. HD 283572 will eventually evolve to an A-type main-sequence star when on the main sequence. It is no longer accreting mass, and is magnetically decoupled from the remnants of the protoplanetary disk, belonging to the terminal, 3rd phase of the disk evolution. Submillimeter Array (SMA) 1.3mm observations of HD 283572 detected an extreme brightening event with a radio luminosity of 8.3×10^{16} erg/s/Hz that spanned 9 hours on January 17th 2022. Although HD 283572 was observed by the SMA on 8 separate nights, millimeter emission was detected on one night only, strongly suggesting stellar variability as a result of an extreme stellar flare.

In 1987, Frederick M. Walter et al. announced that HD 283572 is a variable star. It was given its variable star designation, V987 Tauri, in 1989.

== Protoplanetary system ==
HD 283572 is surrounded by a light (<0.0004 M_{☉}) and faint protoplanetary disk with uncertain inclination. Different instruments yielded measurements of disk inclination to the plane of sky from 35 to 60 degrees. A search for planetary transits was performed but no planets were detected as of 2019.
