= GI Tauri and GK Tauri =

Binary star system in the constellation of Taurus

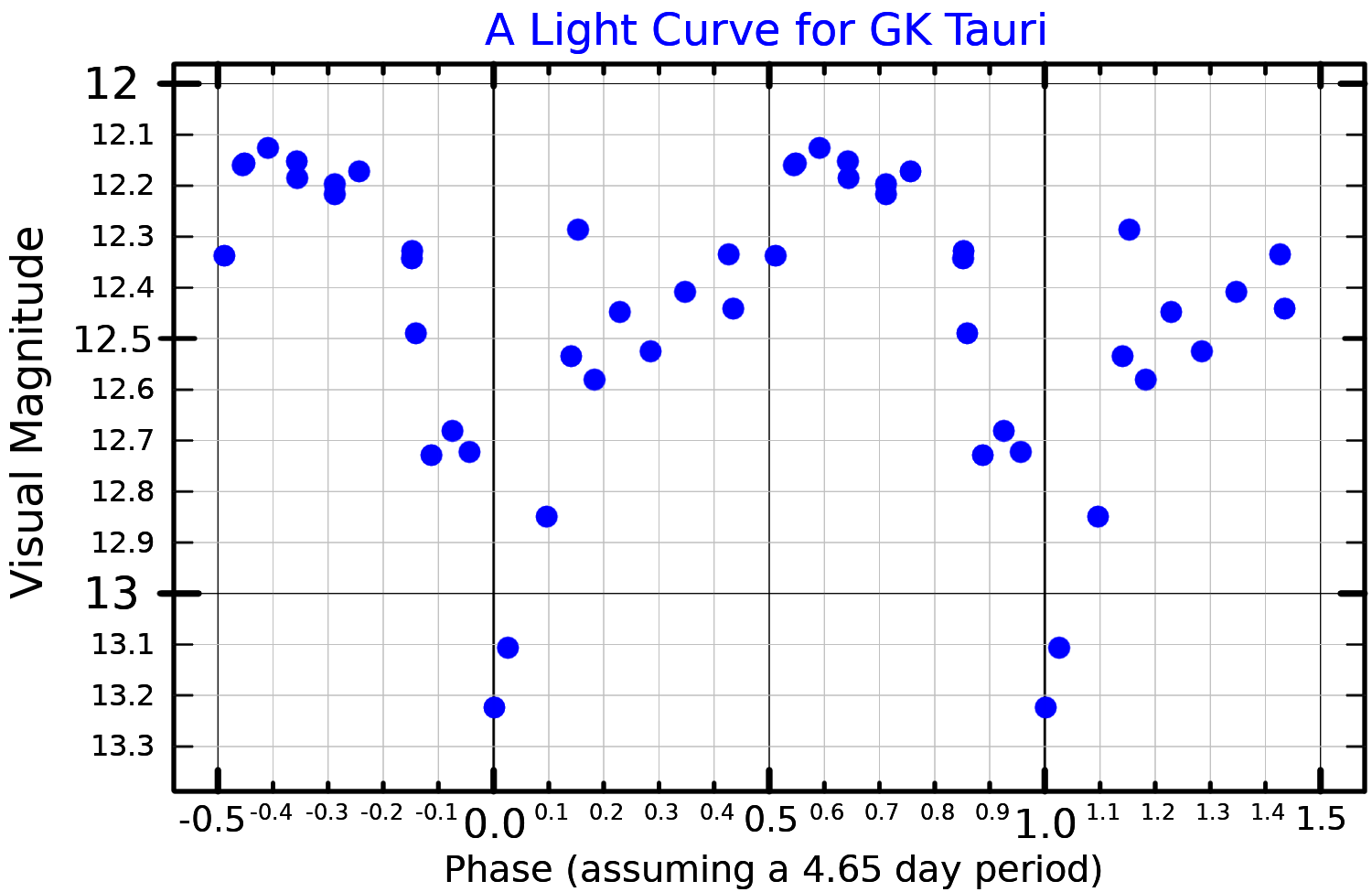
- A visual band light curve for GK tauri, adapted from Bouvier et al. (1993)

Observation data Epoch J2000 Equinox ICRS
- Constellation: Taurus
- GK Tauri
- Right ascension: 04^{h} 33^{m} 34.5627^{s}
- Declination: +24° 21′ 05.854″
- Apparent magnitude (V): 15.10
- GI Tauri
- Right ascension: 04^{h} 33^{m} 34.0609^{s}
- Declination: +24° 21′ 17.067″

Characteristics

GK Tauri
- Evolutionary stage: pre-main-sequence star
- Spectral type: K7
- Apparent magnitude (G): 11.990
- Variable type: T Tau

GI Tauri
- Apparent magnitude (G): 12.608

Astrometry

GK Tauri
Proper motion (μ)	RA: 7.46±0.02 mas/yr Dec.: −20.510±0.017 mas/yr
Parallax (π)	7.7433±0.0185 mas
Distance	421 ± 1 ly (129.1 ± 0.3 pc)

GI Tauri
Proper motion (μ)	RA: 5.76±0.02 mas/yr Dec.: −20.642±0.019 mas/yr
Parallax (π)	7.7258±0.0198 mas
Distance	422 ± 1 ly (129.4 ± 0.3 pc)

Position (relative to GK Tauri)
Component	GI Tauri
Angular distance	13.15797±0.00005″
Position angle	328.4399±0.0002°
Projected separation	1700 AU

Details

GK Tauri
Mass	0.79±0.07 M_{☉}
Luminosity	0.80 L_{☉}
Temperature	4007 K
Age	2±1 Myr

GI Tauri
Mass	0.53^{+0.09}_{−0.11} M_{☉}
Luminosity	0.49 L_{☉}
Temperature	3792 K
Age	2±1 Myr

Other designations
- GK Tauri: Gaia DR3 147790206908395776, 2MASS J04333456+2421058, GSC 01829-00040
- GI Tauri: Gaia DR3 147790000749072768, 2MASS J04333405+2421170, GSC 01829-00082

Database references
SIMBAD	data

GK Tauri is a young T Tauri-type pre-main sequence star in the constellation of Taurus about 421 light years away, belonging to the Taurus Molecular Cloud.

== System ==
The stars GK Tauri and GI Tauri form a wide binary system, with the projected separation between components being 1700 AU. The secondary component's orbit is not very eccentric, with a periastron of at least 890 AU.

GK Tauri was originally believed to have a close stellar companion WDS J04336+2421Ab. However, it was found to be an unrelated background star according to Gaia data.

== Properties ==
Both members of the binary system are medium-mass objects still contracting towards the main sequence and accreting mass, with the primary GK Tauri being close to entering the main sequence.

== Protoplanetary system ==
Both stars are surrounded by compact protoplanetary disks, although the reason for the small disk sizes is not clear. GK Tauri's spectrum indicates a possible gap in the protoplanetary disk and a planet orbiting within the gap, with a semimajor axis of 2.4^{+1.5}_{−1.0} AU.

The GK Tauri planetary system
Companion (in order from star)	Mass	Semimajor axis (AU)	Orbital period (days)	Eccentricity	Inclination (°)	Radius
protoplanetary disk	0–19 AU				40.2^{+5.9}_{−6.2}°	—

The GI Tauri planetary system
Companion (in order from star)	Mass	Semimajor axis (AU)	Orbital period (days)	Eccentricity	Inclination (°)	Radius
protoplanetary disk	0–25 AU				43.8±1.1°	—
