= BM Andromedae =

Star in the constellation Andromeda

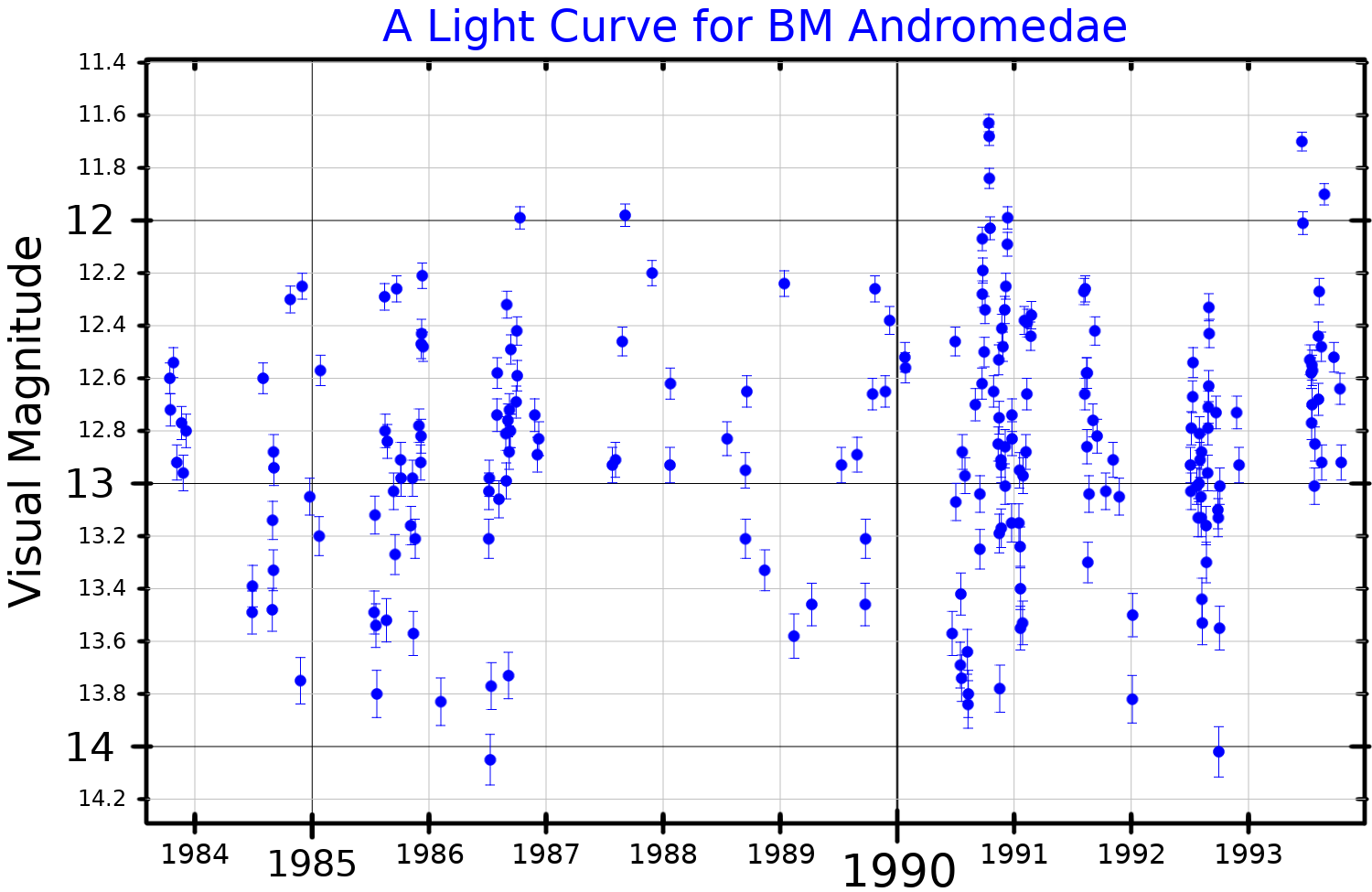
- A visual band light curve for BM Andromedae, plotted from data published by Grinin et al. (1995)

Observation data Epoch J2000 Equinox J2000
- Constellation: Andromeda
- Right ascension: 23^{h} 37^{m} 38.49052^{s}
- Declination: +48° 24′ 11.7624″
- Apparent magnitude (V): 11.63 – 14.02

Characteristics
- Spectral type: F8ea-K5Vea
- Apparent magnitude (B): 12.40
- Apparent magnitude (V): 12.40
- Apparent magnitude (G): 12.76
- Apparent magnitude (J): 10.524
- Apparent magnitude (H): 9.523
- Apparent magnitude (K): 8.810
- Variable type: T Tauri star

Astrometry
Radial velocity (R_{v})	−12.37±3.96 km/s
Proper motion (μ)	RA: −5.249 mas/yr Dec.: +8.452 mas/yr
Parallax (π)	1.2732±0.6439 mas
Distance	approx. 3,000 ly (approx. 800 pc)

Details
Luminosity (bolometric)	5.5 L_{☉}

Other designations
- 2MASS J23373847+4824119, GSC 03642-00171

Database references
SIMBAD	data

BM Andromedae (BM And) is a T Tauri star in the constellation Andromeda. Its apparent visual magnitude has irregular variations between a maximum of 11.63 and a minimum of 14.02.

== Spectrum ==
The exact spectral class of the star is not yet known. Different estimations gives a range F8-K5Vea, meaning that there is agreement in identifying it as a main sequence star more luminous and with stronger emission lines than the usual, a typical classification for young stars that are near the main sequence phase. The star is still accreting, and about 0.23 L_{☉} of 5.5 L_{☉} of its total luminosity is powered by accretion.

The color indexes vary with the star's brightness, but the spectral class of BM Andromedae does not change with the decrease of luminosity. Strong H-alpha lines in the spectra are a sign of a gaseous envelope, while an infrared excess indicates the existence of an extended dust envelope.

== System ==
BM Andromedae is a young stellar object with a circumstellar cloud around it, one stage of the evolution from protostars to the main sequence phase. The cloud is made of a gaseous envelope and an extended dust envelope. The latter can reach a distance of 1 AU from the star and is strongly flattened and observed edge-on. The measurements in 2005-2006 showed a relatively compact, 0.25 AU disk.

It was also found that a correlation exists between the local interstellar magnetic field and the polarization of light emitted by BM Andromedae. Thus, the magnetic field could have played a role in the formation of the system.

== Variability ==
In 1949 Balfour Whitney announced that BM Andromedae (at the time, an unnamed star) is a variable star, based on 400 photographic plates taken from 1942 through 1949. He noted that it varied rapidly and irregularly, sometimes varying by 1 magnitude over the course of a single day.

The envelope blocks a fraction of the light emitted by BM Andromedae, but it's not uniform so this fraction is variable in time. This explains both the brightness variability and the one of color indexes. It was also found that the dust envelope polarizes the light emitted by BM Andromedae; the more light is blocked, the stronger is the polarization. The color of star is dependent on brightness; it becomes redder when fainter.
