= GV Tauri =

Young binary star system in the constellation of Taurus

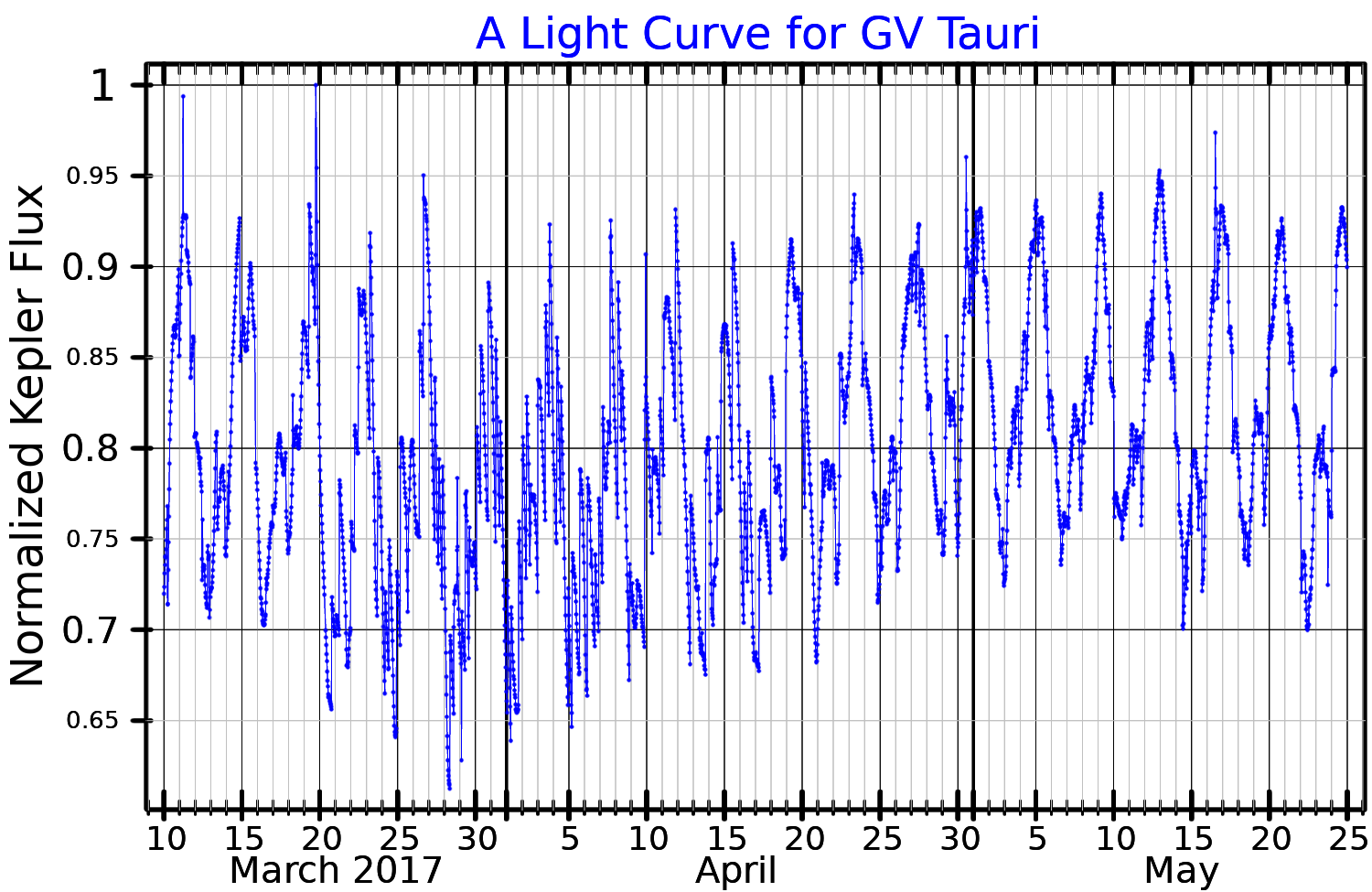
- A light curve for GV Tauri, plotted from Kepler data

Observation data Epoch J2000 Equinox ICRS
- Constellation: Taurus
- GV Tauri A
- Right ascension: 04^{h} 29^{m} 23.71056^{s}
- Declination: +24° 32′ 58.6176″
- GV Tauri B
- Right ascension: 04^{h} 29^{m} 23.6868^{s}
- Declination: +24° 33′ 01.1160″

Characteristics

GV Tauri A
- Evolutionary stage: pre-main-sequence star
- Spectral type: K3
- Apparent magnitude (K): 10.872
- Apparent magnitude (g): 16.282
- Variable type: T Tau

GV Tauri B
- Spectral type: late G to early K
- Apparent magnitude (K): 10.171

Astrometry

GV Tauri A
Proper motion (μ)	RA: 8.0±0.4 mas/yr Dec.: −26.7±0.3 mas/yr
Parallax (π)	7.01±0.34 mas
Distance	470 ± 20 ly (143 ± 7 pc)

GV Tauri B

Position (relative to GV Tauri A)
Component	GV Tauri B
Angular distance	1.2″
Projected separation	170 AU

Details

GV Tauri A
Mass	1.8 M_{☉}
Luminosity	2.3 L_{☉}
Surface gravity (log g)	4.0 cgs
Temperature	4800±200 K
Age	0.5 Myr

GV Tauri B
Luminosity	114 L_{☉}
Age	0.5 Myr

Other designations
- 2MASS J04292373+2433002, Haro 6-10, TIC 268217520, Elia 3-7, LEI 4, HBC 389
- GV Tauri A: Gaia EDR3 149367383323435648, GV Tau S, EPIC 247820507, Haro 6-10 VLA 1, LEI 4A
- GV Tauri B: GV Tau N, Haro 6-10 VLA 2, LEI 4B

Database references
SIMBAD	data

GK Tauri is a young binary system composed of T Tauri-type pre-main sequence stars in the constellation of Taurus about 466 light years away, belonging to the Taurus Molecular Cloud.

In 1978, Jonathan H. Elias announced that the object, then known as Haro 6-10, is a variable star, based on near infrared observations made from 1975 through 1978.

== System ==
The stars GV Tauri A (GV Tauri S) and G Tauri B (GV Tauri N) form a wide binary system, with the projected separation between components being 170 AU. Both are strongly shrouded by circumstellar dust - GV Tauri A by 30 magnitudes and the GV Tauri B up to 59 magnitudes in the V band. Both components are suspected to be binaries themselves, as they produce strongly ionized jets and molecular outflows.

== Properties ==
Both members of the binary system are medium-mass objects still contracting towards the main sequence and accreting mass, although accretion rates remain highly uncertain as of 2009.

== Protoplanetary system ==
Both stars are surrounded by protoplanetary disks, with the observable dust in each being about 5×10^{−5} M_{☉}, and the gas about 0.005 M_{☉}. The disk of GV Tauri B is rich in carbon monoxide, hydrogen cyanide and, unusually, methane.

The GV Tauri A planetary system
Companion (in order from star)	Mass	Semimajor axis (AU)	Orbital period (days)	Eccentricity	Inclination (°)	Radius
protoplanetary disk	0–17 AU				65±5°	—

The GV Tauri B planetary system
Companion (in order from star)	Mass	Semimajor axis (AU)	Orbital period (days)	Eccentricity	Inclination (°)	Radius
protoplanetary disk	20 AU				30 or 80±10°	—
