= DF Tauri =

Binary star in the constellation Taurus

Observation data Epoch J2000.0 Equinox J2000.0
- Constellation: Taurus
- Right ascension: 04^{h} 27^{m} 02.793^{s}
- Declination: +25° 42′ 22.45″
- Apparent magnitude (V): 11.96 (12.62±0.40 + 13.51±0.06)

Characteristics
- Evolutionary stage: Pre-main-sequence
- Spectral type: M3Ve
- B−V color index: 1.47±0.51
- Variable type: T Tau

Astrometry
Radial velocity (R_{v})	17.964±0.008 km/s
Proper motion (μ)	RA: 2.207 mas/yr Dec.: −26.458 mas/yr
Parallax (π)	5.6672±0.4998 mas
Distance	580 ± 50 ly (180 ± 20 pc)

Orbit
Period (P)	52.9±0.4 yr
Semi-major axis (a)	104.2±0.7 mas (~14.6 au)
Eccentricity (e)	0.172±0.003
Inclination (i)	40.4±0.5°
Longitude of the node (Ω)	36.7±0.5°
Periastron epoch (T)	2024.0±0.2
Argument of periastron (ω) (secondary)	286.6±2.1°

Details

Primary
Mass	0.56 M_{☉}
Radius	1.8 R_{☉}
Surface gravity (log g)	3.7±0.2 cgs
Temperature	3,638±109 K K
Rotational velocity (v sin i)	16.4±2.1 km/s
Age	2 Myr

Secondary
Mass	0.42 M_{☉}
Radius	1.6 R_{☉}
Surface gravity (log g)	3.9±0.2 cgs
Temperature	3,433±84 K K
Rotational velocity (v sin i)	46.2±2.8 km/s

Other designations
- DF Tau, HD 283654, HIP 20777, WDS J04271+2542AB, GCRV 55076, IRAS F04239+2535

Database references
SIMBAD	data

DF Tauri (DF Tau) is a young binary star system in the constellation of Taurus located at a distance of approximately 580 light years from the Sun. It is one of the most active T Tauri stars in the star-forming region of Taurus and has been frequently studied. The system has a combined apparent visual magnitude of 11.96, which requires a telescope to observe. The system is drifting further away with a heliocentric radial velocity of 18 km/s.

It lies in a region with relatively low amounts of carbon monoxide and hydrogen.

== Observations ==
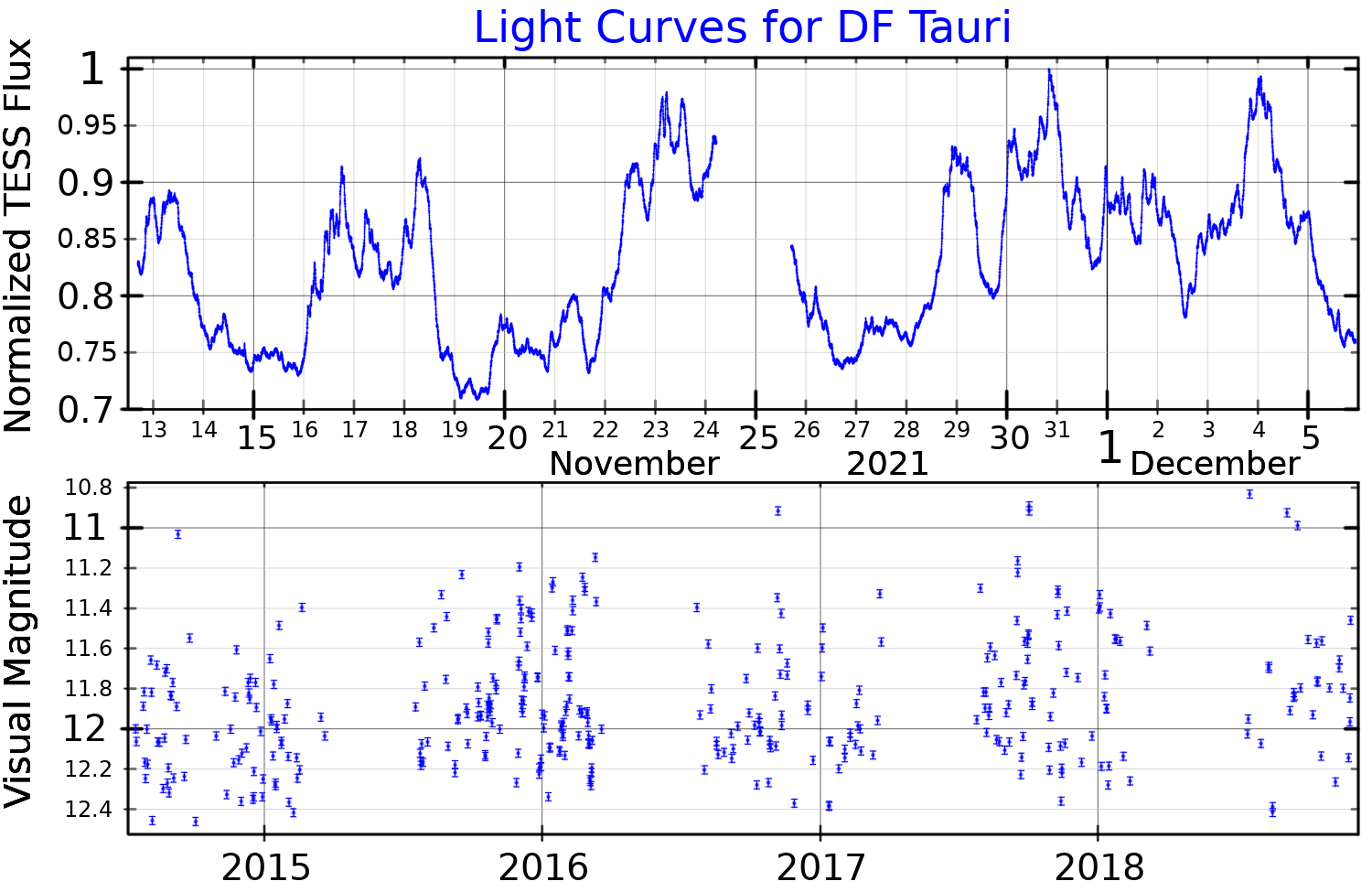
Light curves for DF Tauri. The upper panel shows the short term variability as seen by TESS, and the lower panel shows the longer term variability seen in the ASAS-SN data.

In a 1949 study of stars in the Taurus dark clouds, A. H. Joy found this star (identified as MHα 259–11) had its spectrum cloaked by continuous emission, but he chose not to group it with T Tauri-like stars. It showed a spectrum type of dM0e, which matched a small red dwarf star with emission lines. By 1961 it had been classified as a T Tauri star, being of low luminosity with a spectrum of variable emission lines and an association with a dark nebula. These types of objects were later found to be young, low mass stellar objects at the pre-main-sequence stage.

Observations taken between 1967 and 1975 showed a visual brightness variation of about one magnitude with changes in color due to temperature fluctuations. The variations were thought due to flares lasting 2 to 5 d with energies of about 10^{38} erg. Shorter flares lasting 1–2 h were observed. These flares appeared to come from an opaque region near the stellar surface with an estimated temperature of about 9,000 K.

On October 21, 1986, a lunar occultation of this star was observed from the Mauna Kea Observatories in Hawaii. Data from the observation showed that DF Tau consists of two components, forming a binary system. Evidence for orbital motion was reported in 1995 using speckle interferometry. This provided an early estimate for an orbital period of 82±12 years. However, only 10% of the orbital motion had been observed at this point, so the early solution had a high error level.

By 1993, DF Tau was known to be a very active star displaying an unusually large and highly variable veiling of its stellar absorption lines. It showed significant temperature differences in the veiling material. DF Tau displayed periodic variation of its light curve, which suggests there is a hot spot. However, this is variable over time, indicating the accretion inflow is not to a specific section of the star.

Measurements of absorption lines strongly indicated the presence of hot spots with temperatures over 5,000 K. These are likely caused by mass infall creating a shock wave near the stellar surface. This was confirmed via ultraviolet measurements in 2001, and the mean accretion rate was measured at 3×10^{−9} M_{☉}/yr. Historical light curve data indicated that the accretion rate from the primary circumstellar disk was modulated by the orbital motion of the secondary companion.

=== Resolved components ===
In 2019, instruments on the Keck II were able to resolve the individual components of the system, allowing a more precise orbital solution to be computed. The two components are of nearly equal mass but with distinct circumstellar properties. The primary star, component A, shows strong indicators of accretion from a circumstellar disk, while similar data from the secondary, component B, is weak or absent. The secondary star appears to be rotating around three times as rapidly as the primary, which suggests its disk has begun to dissipate while the primary rotation is still disk-locked. The orbital period was found to be closer to 46.1±1.9 years with an orbital eccentricity of 0.233±0.038.

Outflow from a jet (and counter-jet) were detected from observations taken in 1998, extending out to 60 au from the primary. The outflow is accelerated out to a radius of up to 12 au, reaching a steady velocity thereafter of at least 150 to 200 km/s. The jets are being powered by gravitational energy generated during the accretion process.

In 2024, observations with the Atacama Large Millimeter Array demonstrated that the secondary component does indeed have a circumstellar disk. To reconcile the observations, it was proposed that there is a small cavity in the disk of component B with a radius of ~1 au. Infrared measurements with the JWST found the disks show a rich emission from molecules of CO, C_{2}H_{2}, HCN, OH, and H_{2}. The circumstellar disk around component A has an estimated radius of 3.7+0.3
−0.2 au and an inclination of 41°+13°
−7° to the plane of the sky. The dust in the disk has a mass of 1.4±0.10 times the mass of the Earth. The disk for component B has 1.17±1.11 Earth masses with a radius of 3.6+0.8
−0.6 au and an inclination of 46°±9°. Each disk appears to have been tidally truncated by its companion star. There is no evidence for a circumbinary disk.

== Structure ==
The DF Tauru systems contains two stars making it a binary star system. It also has a circumstellar disk.

=== Jet ===
The system contains a microjet traveling at around 100 kilometers a second.

=== Ring nebula ===
Surrounding DF Tauri is a Hydrogen-alpha emitting ring shaped nebula with a radius of about 1.5x10^4 AU. However this ring nebula is shifted from the center of the system. It moves at a speed of 24 kilometers per second. It could either be a Hii region or more likely a shock wave resulting from poor collimated winds of the DF Tauru stars. It may also not be a ring at all but Ilinstead of gas bubble.
