= Henyey track =

Path taken by pre-main-sequence stars in the Hertzsprung–Russell diagram

An HR Diagram of PMS stars with different masses. The Hayashi Track is depicted as vertical lines, while the Henyey are horizontal. Higher mass stars spend very little time on the Hayashi Track, while the lowest mass stars never reach the Henyey Track, with a gradient seen of time spent on each track as the mass increases.

The Henyey track is a path taken by pre-main-sequence stars with masses greater than 0.5 solar masses in the Hertzsprung–Russell diagram after the end of the Hayashi track. The astronomer Louis G. Henyey and his colleagues in the 1950s showed that the pre-main-sequence star can remain in radiative equilibrium throughout some period of its contraction to the main sequence.

The Henyey track is characterized by a slow collapse in near hydrostatic equilibrium, approaching the main sequence almost horizontally in the Hertzsprung–Russell diagram (i.e. the luminosity remains almost constant).

== Deviation from Hayashi Track ==
$$\begin{align}
\frac {dT}{dt} &= \frac {-3\rho\kappa l(r)}{64\pi\sigma _{sb}T^3r^2}  \\[4pt]
\end{align}$$

The equation for radiative heat transfer tells us the relation of opacity (κ) and temperature gradient T. Stars with high opacity will be convective, while low opacity will be radiative for heat transfer.

Protostars on the Hayashi track are fully convective and due to the large presence of H- ions, are optically thick. These stars will continue to contract, until the central core reaches a certain temperature threshold, where the H- ions will break apart, causing a decrease in opacity.

What determines when and how long a star moves from the Hayashi track to the Henyey track is heavily dependent on its initial mass. Stars that are massive enough (0.5 solar mass) will deviate onto the Henyey Track, depicted as a near-horizontal line on an HR diagram. A core that becomes sufficiently hot enough will become less opaque, making convection inefficient. The core will instead become fully radiative to transfer its thermal energy. During this phase the luminosity stays constant or gradually increases, with the temperature increasing as the core undergoes radiative contraction. At the end of the track, the star will undergo nuclear burning, however, and will experience a dip in luminosity, until it reaches the main sequence.

Larger mass stars will evolve quickly from the Hayashi track, while lower mass stars will enter later. Stars that are not sufficiently massive on the other hand will never develop a radiative core, as the core does not become hot enough, and instead, will remain on the Hayashi track until it reaches the main sequence.

== See also ==
- Stellar evolution
- Stellar birthline
- Stellar isochrone
