= BP Tauri =

Star in the constellation Taurus

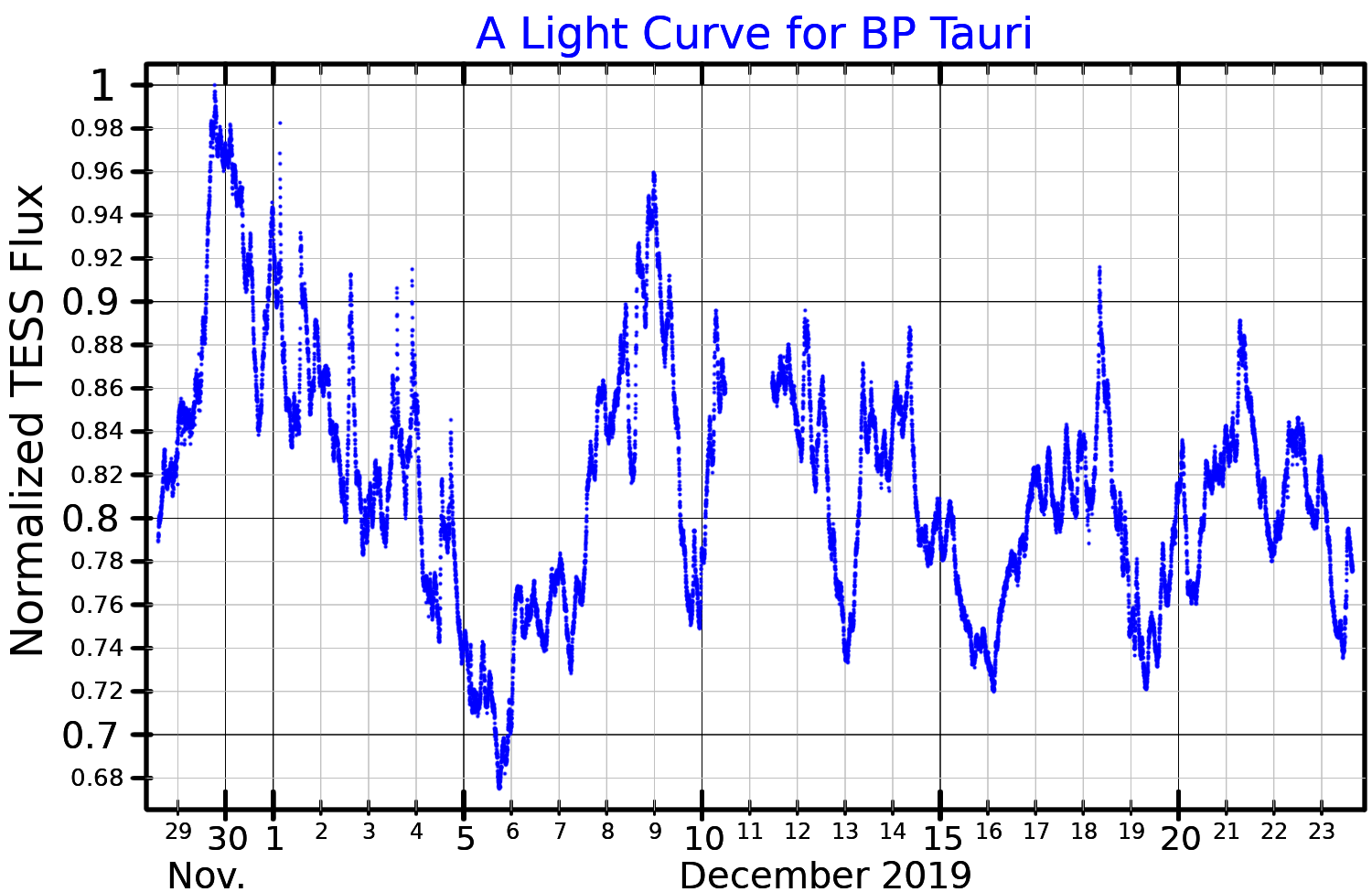
- A light curve for BP Tauri, plotted from TESS data

Observation data Epoch J2000 Equinox ICRS
- Constellation: Taurus
- Right ascension: 04^{h} 19^{m} 15.8343^{s}
- Declination: +29° 06′ 26.9295″
- Apparent magnitude (V): 12.12

Characteristics
- Evolutionary stage: pre-main-sequence star
- Spectral type: K5
- Apparent magnitude (G): 11.460
- Variable type: T Tau

Astrometry
Radial velocity (R_{v})	15.76±0.13 km/s
Proper motion (μ)	RA: 8.889 mas/yr Dec.: -26.011 mas/yr
Parallax (π)	7.8494±0.0362 mas
Distance	416 ± 2 ly (127.4 ± 0.6 pc)

Details
Mass	1.24^{+0.25}_{−0.32} M_{☉}
Radius	2.0 R_{☉}
Luminosity	0.93 L_{☉}
Surface gravity (log g)	4.32±0.14 cgs
Temperature	3640^{+94}_{−92} K
Rotational velocity (v sin i)	11.4^{+0.25}_{−0.55} km/s
Age	6±4 Myr

Other designations
- HD 281934, HIP 20160, TYC 1827-554-1, GSC 01827-00554, 2MASS J04191583+2906269, Gaia DR2 164832740220756608

Database references
SIMBAD	data

BP Tauri is a young T Tauri star in the constellation of Taurus about 416 light years away, belonging to the Taurus Molecular Cloud.

== Properties ==
BP Tauri is still accreting mass at the low rate of 9×10^{−10} M_{☉} and 1.6×10^{−7} M_{☉}/year, as evidenced by X-rays produced by infalling matter, and may be still in the process of spin-up. Its chromospheric magnetic fields are rather strong at 2.5^{+0.15}_{−0.16} kilogauss, and contains strong non-dipole components. The star is producing 40% of its luminosity via the energy released by accretion.

== Suspected companions ==
There were two suspected stellar companions to BP Tauri on projected separations 3.00 and 5.45 arcseconds. These were proven to be a background stars not related to BP Tauri with Gaia data though.

== Protoplanetary system ==
The star is surrounded by a protoplanetary disk. The disk is strongly depleted in carbon and carbon monoxide.

The planetary system
Companion (in order from star)	Mass	Semimajor axis (AU)	Orbital period (days)	Eccentricity	Inclination (°)	Radius
protoplanetary disk	0–120 AU				30°	—

== Variability ==
In 1935, Inna N. Lehmann-Balanowskaja discovered that BP Tauri is a variable star. Its variation in brightness is caused by strong flares due to unsteady accretion held by the stellar magnetic field. The lightcurve period is variable from 6.1 to 7.6 days, and quiescent periods without variability are also known.
