= HD 35984 =

Star in the constellation Auriga

Observation data Epoch J2000 Equinox ICRS
- Constellation: Auriga
- Right ascension: 05^{h} 29^{m} 40.65382^{s}
- Declination: +29° 11′ 11.2704″
- Apparent magnitude (V): 6.20

Characteristics
- Evolutionary stage: main sequence or subgiant
- Spectral type: F6III
- U−B color index: +0.02
- B−V color index: +0.45

Astrometry
Radial velocity (R_{v})	+13.98±0.15 km/s
Proper motion (μ)	RA: +28.262 mas/yr Dec.: −46.896 mas/yr
Parallax (π)	12.5607±0.0293 mas
Distance	259.7 ± 0.6 ly (79.6 ± 0.2 pc)
Absolute magnitude (M_{V})	1.50

Details
Mass	1.31 M_{☉}
Radius	3.26 R_{☉}
Luminosity	16.7 L_{☉}
Surface gravity (log g)	3.53 cgs
Temperature	6,465 K
Metallicity [Fe/H]	0.19 dex
Rotation	29.5 days
Rotational velocity (v sin i)	40 km/s
Age	1.26±0.12 Gyr

Other designations
- BD+29°909, HD 35984, HIP 25730, HR 1822, SAO 77205

Database references
SIMBAD	data

HD 35984 is star in the northern constellation Auriga. It has an apparent magnitude of 6.20, which, according to the Bortle scale, indicates it is faintly visible to the naked eye from dark rural skies. Parallax measurements by the Gaia satellite indicate it lies at a distance of roughly 260 light years.

A stellar classification of F6III suggests that this is an evolved giant star that has consumed the supply of hydrogen at its core. However, X-ray emission, variations in luminosity, and levels of lithium may indicate that this is instead a weak-lined T Tauri star—a low mass pre-main sequence star that is relatively poor in circumstellar matter.
