= DL Tauri =

Protostar system with planetary system in the constellation of Taurus

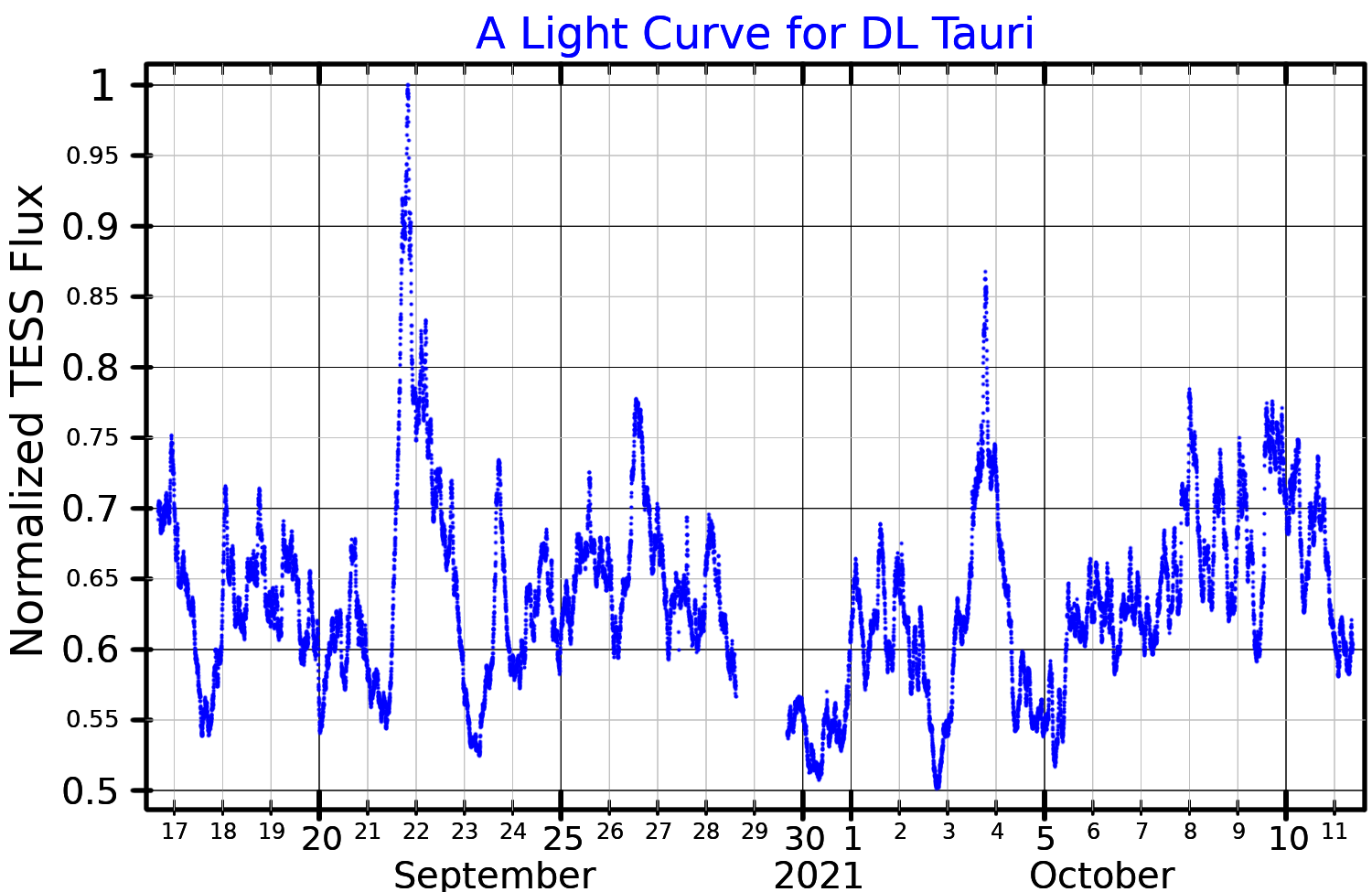
- A light curve for DL Tauri, plotted from TESS data

Observation data Epoch J2000 Equinox ICRS
- Constellation: Taurus
- DL Tauri
- Right ascension: 04^{h} 33^{m} 39.0767^{s}
- Declination: +25° 20′ 38.0980″
- Apparent magnitude (V): 13.06

Characteristics
- Evolutionary stage: pre-main-sequence star
- Spectral type: K7
- Apparent magnitude (U): 14.04
- Apparent magnitude (g): 12.1368
- Apparent magnitude (B): 14.59
- Apparent magnitude (R): 11.85
- Variable type: T Tau

Astrometry
Proper motion (μ)	RA: 9.25±0.02 mas/yr Dec.: −18.497±0.017 mas/yr
Parallax (π)	6.2525±0.0194 mas
Distance	522 ± 2 ly (159.9 ± 0.5 pc)

Details
Mass	0.72±0.11 M_{☉}
Luminosity	0.68 L_{☉}
Temperature	4060 K
Age	1 Myr

Other designations
- 2MASS J04333906+2520382, TIC 268444139, HBC 58, UBV 4371, Gaia DR2 148010281032823552

Database references
SIMBAD	data

DL Tauri is a young T Tauri-type pre-main sequence stars in the constellation of Taurus about 522 light years away, belonging to the Taurus Molecular Cloud. It is partially obscured by the foreground gas cloud rich in carbon monoxide, and is still accreting mass, producing 0.14 L_{☉} due to release of accretion energy. The stellar spectrum shows the lines of ionized oxygen, nitrogen, sulfur and iron.

== Protoplanetary disk ==
Star is surrounded by a massive (0.029±0.003 M_{☉}) protoplanetary disk, which is extensive yet relatively flattened and rich in large grains, indicating a significantly evolved state. With a mass this massive the disk can possibly form a brown dwarf. The area of disk about 100 AU from the star may be on the verge of the gravitational instability. The disk has multiple dust rings with poorly resolved gaps between.

== Suspected planetary companion ==
The object 2MASS J04333960+2520420, designated DL Tau/cc1 in 2008, is a suspected superjovian planet with a mass of about 12M_{J} on the likely bound orbit around DL Tauri. The object is either a sub-brown dwarf or a low mass brown dwarf or even a low-mass ultra-cool red dwarf star if strongly veiled by accretion disk, which is not unusual for young star systems.

The DL Tauri planetary system
Companion (in order from star)	Mass	Semimajor axis (AU)	Orbital period (days)	Eccentricity	Inclination (°)	Radius
protoplanetary disk	8.18±0.89–520 AU				44.33±0.16°	—
