= XZ =

XZ, X.Z., or xz may refer to:

== Transportation ==
- AeroItalia (IATA code: XZ), an Italian airline
- South African Express SA Express (former IATA code: XZ), a former South African airline
- XZ, a type of PSA X automobile engine
- Yamaha XZ 550, a motorcycle

== Computing ==
- xz, a lossless data compression file format based on the LZMA algorithm, often with the file extension ".xz"
  - XZ Utils, a set of free lossless data compressors, including the xz command

== Other uses ==
- Tibet Autonomous Region (Guobiao abbreviation: XZ), China

== See also ==
- XZ Tauri, a binary star system in the constellation Taurus
- Sony Xperia XZ, an Android smartphone
