= Stellar birthline =

Construct in astrophysics

The stellar birthline is a predicted line on the Hertzsprung–Russell diagram that relates the effective temperature and luminosity of pre-main-sequence stars at the start of their contraction. Prior to this point, the objects are accreting protostars, and are so deeply embedded in the cloud of dust and gas from which they are forming that they radiate only in far infrared and millimeter wavelengths. Once stellar winds disperse this cloud, the star becomes visible as a pre-main-sequence object. The set of locations on the Hertzsprung–Russell diagram where these newly visible stars reside is called the birthline, and is found above the main sequence.

The location of the stellar birthline depends in detail on the accretion rate and geometry, i.e. whether or not it is occurring through an accretion disk. This means that the birthline is not an infinitely thin curve, but has a finite thickness in the Hertzsprung-Russell diagram.

== See also ==
- Hayashi track
- Henyey track
- Pre-main-sequence star
- Protostar
- Stellar isochrone
- T Tauri star
