= Dynamic equilibrium (disambiguation) =

Dynamic equilibrium is reversible chemical reaction which has achieved a steady state.

It may also refer to:

- Dynamic equilibrium (economics), a theory in economics referring to market equilibria
- Dynamic equilibrium (mechanics), a theory in classical mechanics applying to rigid body dynamics

== See also ==
- Thermodynamic equilibrium
