= Hayashi limit =

Value in astrophysics

This HR diagram illustrates pre-main-sequence tracks for various stellar masses and ages. To the right is the Hayashi "forbidden zone".

The Hayashi limit is a theoretical constraint upon the maximum radius of a star for a given mass. When a star is fully within hydrostatic equilibrium—a condition where the inward force of gravity is matched by the outward pressure of the gas—the star can not exceed the radius defined by the Hayashi limit. This has important implications for the evolution of a star, both during the formulative contraction period and later when the star has consumed most of its hydrogen supply through nuclear fusion.

A Hertzsprung-Russell diagram displays a plot of a star's surface temperature against the luminosity. On this diagram, the Hayashi limit forms a nearly vertical line at about 3,500 K. The outer layers of low temperature stars are always convective, and models of stellar structure for fully convective stars do not provide a solution to the right of this line. Thus in theory, stars are constrained to remain to the left of this limit during all periods when they are in hydrostatic equilibrium, and the region to the right of the line forms a type of "forbidden zone". Note, however, that there are exceptions to the Hayashi limit. These include collapsing protostars, as well as stars with magnetic fields that interfere with the internal transport of energy through convection.

Red giants are stars that have expanded their outer envelope in order to support the nuclear fusion of helium. This moves them up and to the right on the H-R diagram. However, they are constrained by the Hayashi limit not to expand beyond a certain radius. Stars that find themselves across the Hayashi limit have large convection currents in their interior driven by massive temperature gradients. Additionally, those stars states are unstable so the stars rapidly adjust their states, moving in the Hertzprung-Russel diagram until they reach the Hayashi limit.

When lower mass stars in the main sequence start expanding and becoming a red giant the stars revisit the Hayashi track. The Hayashi limit constrains the asymptotic giant branch evolution of stars which is important in the late evolution of stars and can be observed, for example, in the ascending branches of the Hertzsprung–Russell diagrams of globular clusters, which have stars of approximately the same age and composition.

The Hayashi limit is named after Chūshirō Hayashi, a Japanese astrophysicist.

Despite its importance to protostars and late stage main sequence stars, the Hayashi limit was only recognized in Hayashi’s paper in 1961. This late recognition may be because the properties of the Hayashi track required numerical calculations that were not fully developed before.

== Derivation of the limit ==
We can derive the relation between the luminosity, temperature and pressure for a simple model for a fully convective star and from the form of this relation we can infer the Hayashi limit. This is an extremely crude model of what occurs in convective stars, but it has good qualitative agreement with the full model with less complications. We follow the derivation in Kippenhahn, Weigert, and Weiss in Stellar Structure and Evolution.

Nearly all of the interior part of convective stars has an adiabatic stratification (corrections to this are small for fully convective regions), such that

$\frac{\delta ln T}{\delta ln P} = \nabla_{adiabatic} = 0.4$, which holds for an adiabatic expansion of an ideal gas.

We assume that this relation holds from the interior to the surface of the star—the surface is called photosphere. We assume $\nabla_{adiabatic}$ to be constant throughout the interior of the star with value 0.4. However, we obtain the correct distinctive behavior.

For the interior we consider a simple polytropic relation between P and T:

$P = C T^{(1+n)}$

With the index $n = 3/2$.

We assume the relation above to hold until the photosphere where we assume to have a simple absorption law

$\kappa = \kappa_0 P^a T^b$

Then, we use the hydrostatic equilibrium equation and integrate it with respect to the radius to give us

$P_0 = Constant * \left(\frac{M}{R^2} T_{eff}^{-b} \right)^{\frac{1}{1+a}}$

For the solution in the interior we set $P = P_0$ ; $T = T_{eff}$ in the P-T relation and then eliminate pressure of this equation. Luminosity is given by the Stephan-Boltzmann law applied to a perfect black body:

$L = 4 \pi R^2 \sigma \, T_{eff}^4$.

Thus, any value of R corresponds to a certain point in the Hertzsprung–Russell diagram.

Finally, after some algebra this is the equation for the Hayashi limit in the Hertzsprung–Russell diagram:

$\log (T_{eff}) = A \log (L) + B \log (M) + constant$

With coefficients

$A = \frac{0.75a - 0.25}{b-5.5a +1.5}$, $B = \frac{0.5a - 1.5}{b-5.5a +1.5}$

Takeaways from plugin in $a \approx 1$ and $b \approx 3$ for a cool hydrogen ion dominated atmosphere oppacity model ($T < 5000 K$):

- The Hayashi limit must be far to the right in the Hertzsprung–Russell diagram which means temperatures have to be low.
- The Hayashi limit must be very steep. The gradient of Luminosity with respect to temperature has to be large.
- The Hayashi limit shifts slightly to the left in the Hertzsprung–Russell diagram for increasing M.

These predictions are supported by numerical simulations of stars.

== What happens when stars cross the limit ==
Until now we have made no claims on the stability of locale to the left, right or at the Hayashi limit in the Hertzsprung–Russell diagram. To the left of the Hayashi limit, we have $\nabla < \nabla_{adiabatic}$ and some part of the model is radiative. The model is fully convective at the Hayashi limit with $\nabla = \nabla_{adiabatic}$. Models to the right of the Hayashi limit should have $\nabla > \nabla_{adiabatic}$.

If a star is formed such that some region in its deep interior has large $\nabla - \nabla_{adiabatic}>0$ large convective fluxes with velocities $v_{convective} \approx (\nabla - \nabla_{adiabatic}) /2$. The convective fluxes of energy cooldown the interior rapidly until $\nabla = \nabla_{adiabatic}$ and the star has moved to the Hayashi limit. In fact, it can be shown from the mixing length model that even a small excess can transport energy from the deep interior to the surface by convective fluxes. This will happen within the short timescale for the adjustment of convection which is still larger than timescales for non-equilibrium processes in the star such as hydrodynamic adjustment associated with the thermal time scale. Hence, the limit between an “allowed” stable region (left) and a “forbidden” unstable region (right) for stars of given M and composition that are in hydrostatic equilibrium and have a fully adjusted convection is the Hayashi limit.

== See also ==
- Eddington limit
