= HOPS 383 =

Class 0 protostar

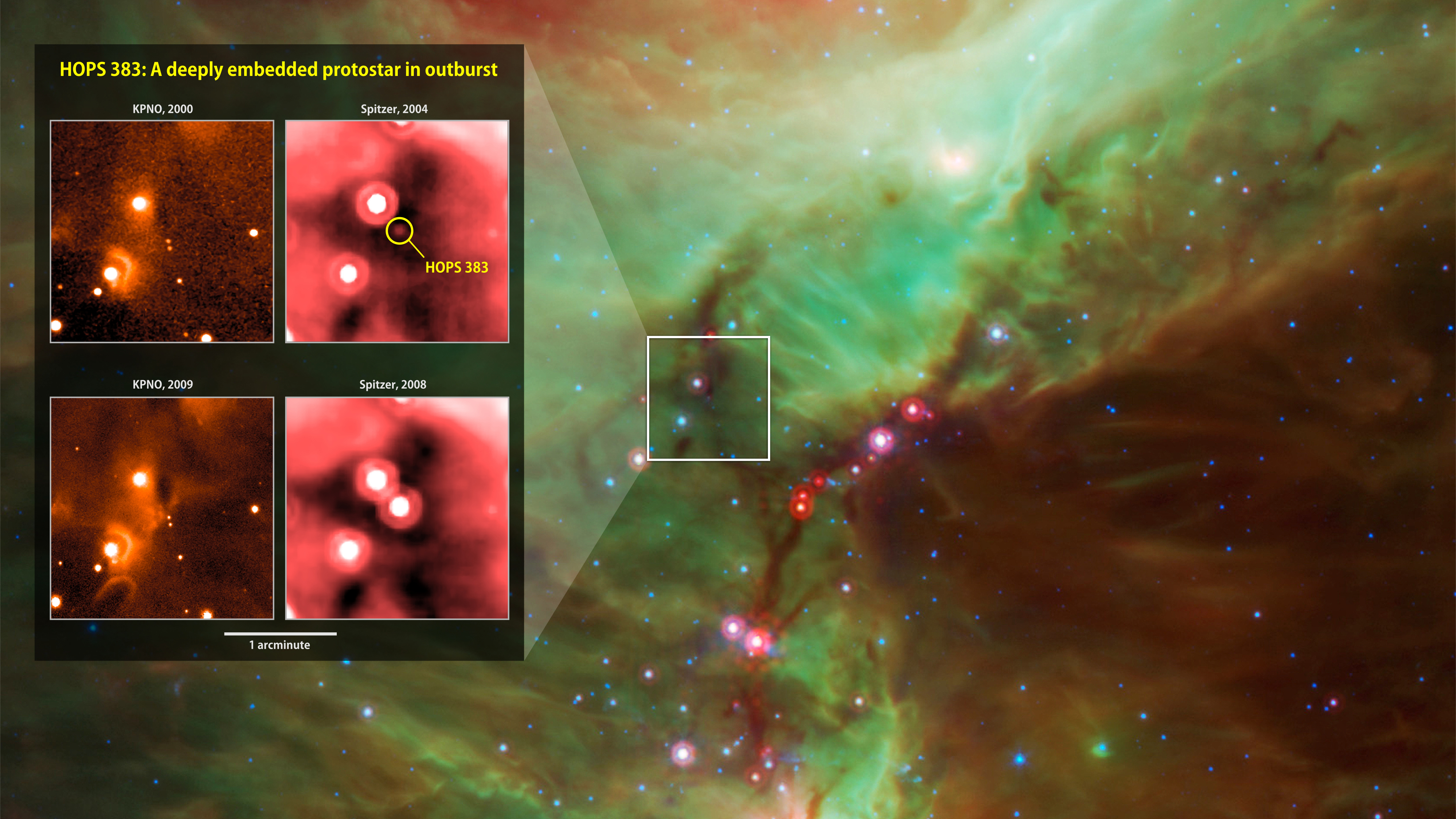
- Infrared images from instruments at Kitt Peak National Observatory (left) and NASA's Spitzer Space Telescope document the outburst of HOPS 383, a young protostar in the Orion star-formation complex. The background is a wide view of the region taken from a Spitzer four-color infrared mosaic.

Observation data Epoch J2000.0 Equinox J2000.0
- Constellation: Orion
- Right ascension: 05^{h} 35^{m} 29.81^{s}
- Declination: −04° 59′ 51.1″

Characteristics
- Evolutionary stage: Class 0 protostar

Astrometry
Distance	1,400 ly (420 pc)

Other designations
- HOPS 383

Database references
SIMBAD	data

HOPS 383 is a Class 0 protostar. It is the first Class 0 protostar discovered to have had an outburst, and as of 2020, the youngest protostar known to have had an outburst. The outburst, discovered by the Herschel Orion Protostar Survey (HOPS) team, was first reported in February 2015 in The Astrophysical Journal Letters.

== Observations ==
=== Outburst ===
HOPS 383 had an outburst between 2004 and 2006 (a "dramatic mid-infrared brightening"); the increase in magnitude was detectable at the 24 μm (35 times increase) and 4.5 μm, and was also detectable at the submillimetre. After 6 years, observations showed no signs of fading.

=== X-Ray ===
The Chandra X-Ray Observatory detected an X-ray flare from HOPS 383 in December 2017. This was the first detection of X-rays from a Class 0 protostar that will evolve into a sun-like star. The flare lasted 3 hours and 20 minutes. It significantly impacted the previously-thought timeline for when such events occur in the evolution of a protostar. Furthermore, it has improved astronomers' understanding of the Sun's earlier evolutionary stages.
