= Stellar isochrone =

Curve on the Hertzsprung-Russell diagram representing stars of a particular age

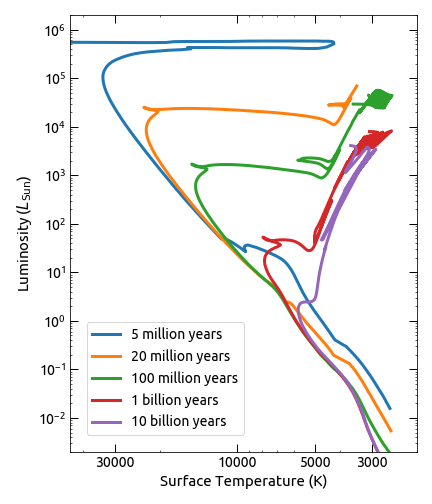
Theoretical isochrones for near-solar metallicity and a range of ages

In stellar evolution, an isochrone is a curve on the Hertzsprung-Russell diagram, representing a population of stars of the same age but with different mass.

The Hertzsprung-Russell diagram plots a star's luminosity against its temperature, or equivalently, its color. Stars change their positions on the HR diagram throughout their life. Newborn stars of low or intermediate mass are born cold but extremely luminous. They contract and dim along the Hayashi track, decreasing in luminosity but staying at roughly the same temperature, until reaching the main sequence directly or by passing through the Henyey track. Stars evolve relatively slowly along the main sequence as they fuse hydrogen, and after the vast majority of their lifespan, all but the least massive stars become giants. They then evolve quickly towards their stellar endpoints: white dwarfs, neutron stars, or black holes.

Isochrones can be used to date open clusters because their members all have roughly the same age. One of the first uses of an isochrone method to date an open cluster was by Demarque and Larson in 1963. If the initial mass function of the open cluster is known, isochrones can be calculated at any age by taking every star in the initial population, using numerical simulations to evolve it forwards to the desired age, and plotting the star's luminosity and magnitude on the HR diagram. The resulting curve is an isochrone, which can be compared against the observational color-magnitude diagram to determine how well they match. If they match well, the assumed age of the isochrone is close to the actual age of the cluster.

== See also ==
- Stellar birthline
