= XZ Tauri =

Star in the constellation Taurus

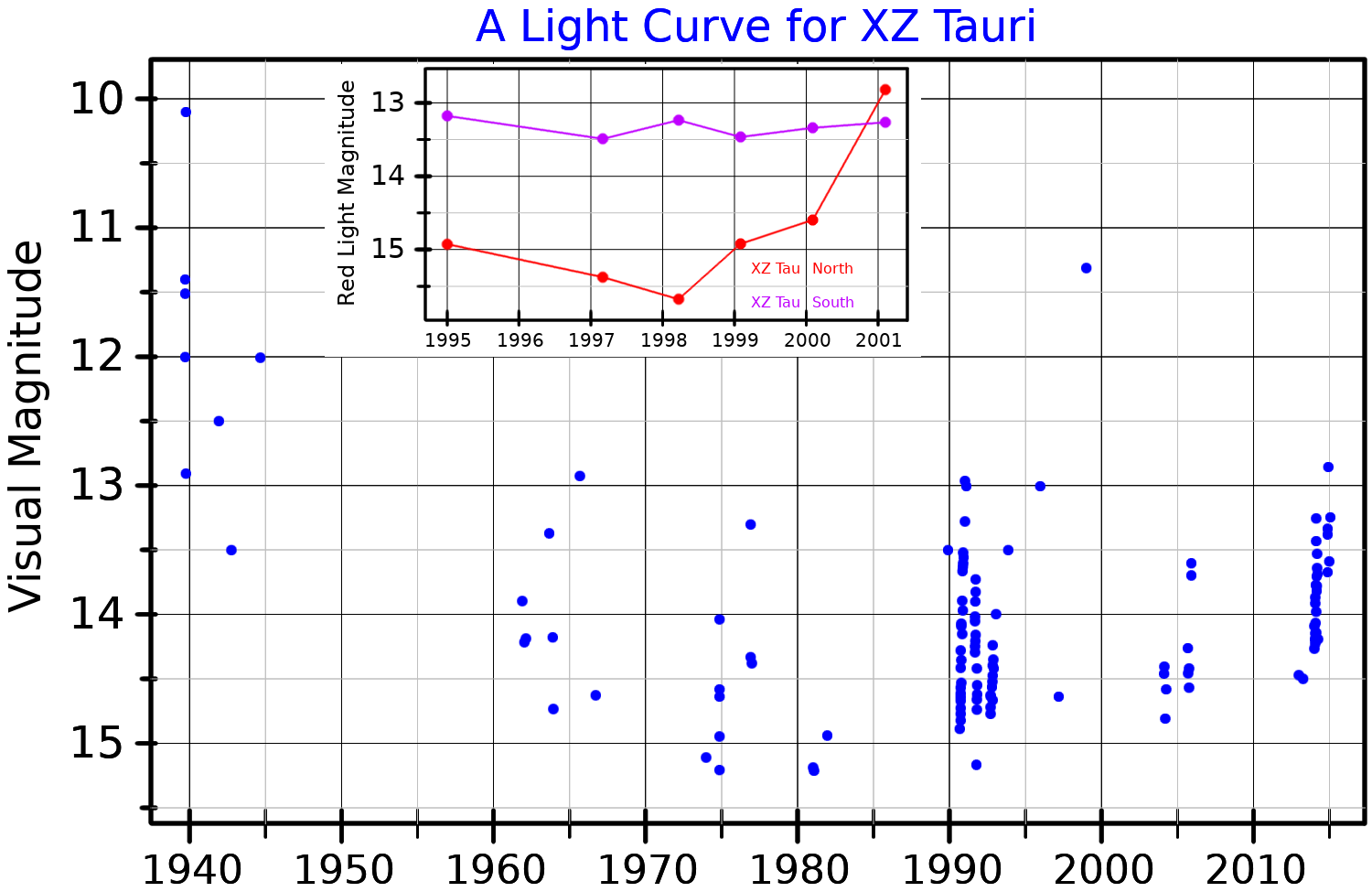
- A visual band light curve for XZ Tauri. The main plot shows the long-term variability, and the inset shows the year 2000 superflare on the north star. Adapted from Dodin et al. (2016) and Coffey et al. (2004).

Observation data Epoch J2000.0 Equinox J2000.0
- Constellation: Taurus
- Right ascension: 04^{h} 31^{m} 40.08690^{s}
- Declination: +18° 13′ 56.6424″
- Apparent magnitude (V): 10.40

Characteristics
- Spectral type: M2.0 + M3.5

Astrometry
| Proper motion (μ) | RA: 9.1 mas/yr Dec.: −17.8 mas/yr |
| Distance | 460 ly (140 pc) |

Orbit
| Primary | A (Note: Sources vary on their definitions of the primary and secondary components. A is defined here as the more massive component, with a lower temperature but higher luminosity. Other sources refer to the components as north and south, or Aa and Ab. The southerly star Ab is generally brighter at optical wavelengths and more massive, but is less luminous.) |
| Name | B |
| Period (P) | 155 yr |
| Semi-major axis (a) | 0.172+0.002 −0.003″ |
| Eccentricity (e) | 0.742+0.025 −0.034 |
| Inclination (i) | 0.0° |
| Argument of periastron (ω) (secondary) | −42.2+2.0 −4.7° |

Details

A
| Mass | 0.37 M_{☉} |
| Radius | 1.1 R_{☉} |
| Luminosity | 0.17 L_{☉} |

B
| Mass | 0.29 M_{☉} |
| Radius | 1.7 R_{☉} |
| Luminosity | 0.31 L_{☉} |
| Temperature | 3,550 K |
| Age | 4.6 Myr |

Other designations
- XZ Tau, GSC 01269-00171

Database references
| SIMBAD | data |

XZ Tauri is a binary system approximately 460 light-years away in the constellation Taurus. The system consists of two T Tauri stars orbiting each other about 6 billion kilometers apart (roughly the same distance as Pluto is from the Sun). The system made news in 2000 when a superflare was observed in the system.

A third star, component C, has been observed at a separation of 0.09″, but subsequent observations failed to find it. The T Tauri star HL Tauri, 23″ away, is also sometimes listed as a companion.

The discovery by Pelageya Fedorovna Shajn, that XZ Tauri is a variable star, was announced in 1928.

== Gallery ==
Hubble image of XZ Tauri.

An animation of the 2000 superflare in the system.
