= Chushiro Hayashi =

Japanese astrophysicist (1920–2010)

Chūshirō Hayashi
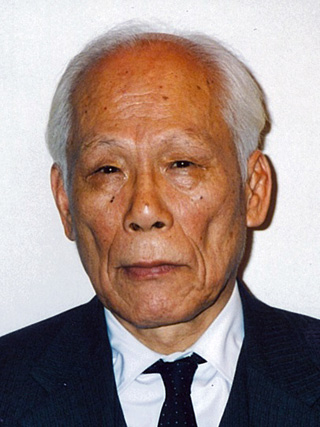
- Born: July 25, 1920; Kyoto, Japan
- Died: February 28, 2010 (aged 89); Kyoto, Japan
- Education: University of Tokyo
- Known for: Hayashi track
- Awards: Eddington Medal in 1970; Kyoto Prize in 1995; Bruce Medal in 2004
- Scientific career
- Fields: astrophysics
- Workplaces: Kyoto University
- Doctoral advisor: Hideki Yukawa
- Doctoral students: Katsuhiko Sato

Chushiro Hayashi (林 忠四郎, Hayashi Chūshirō; July 25, 1920 – February 28, 2010) was a Japanese astrophysicist. Hayashi tracks on the Hertzsprung–Russell diagram are named after him.

== Early life and education ==
Hayashi was born in Kyoto and enrolled at the Tokyo Imperial University (now the University of Tokyo) in 1940, earning his BSc in Physics after 2½ years in 1942. He was classmates with Yoichiro Nambu. He was conscripted into the navy and, after the war ended, joined the group of Hideki Yukawa at Kyoto University. He was appointed a professor at Kyoto University in 1957.

== Career ==
He made additions to the Big Bang nucleosynthesis model that built upon the work of the classic Alpher–Bethe–Gamow paper. Probably his most famous work was the astrophysical calculations that led to the Hayashi tracks of star formation, and the Hayashi limit that puts a limit on star radius. He was also involved in the early study of brown dwarfs, some of the smallest stars formed.

He retired in 1984 and died from pneumonia at a Kyoto hospital on February 28, 2010.

== Awards and honours ==
- 1965 Asahi Prize
- 1970 Eddington Medal
- 1971 Imperial Prize of the Japan Academy
- 1994 Order of the Sacred Treasure, First Class
- 1995 Kyoto Prize
- 2004 Bruce Medal
- Asteroid 12141 Chushayashi is named after him.
