= Radiative equilibrium =

Condition in thermodynamics

Radiative equilibrium is the condition where the total thermal radiation leaving an object is equal to the total thermal radiation entering it. It is one of the several requirements for thermodynamic equilibrium, but it can occur in the absence of thermodynamic equilibrium. There are various types of radiative equilibrium, which is itself a kind of dynamic equilibrium.

== Definitions ==
Equilibrium, in general, is a state in which opposing forces are balanced, and hence a system does not change in time. Radiative equilibrium is the specific case of thermal equilibrium, for the case in which the exchange of heat is done by radiative heat transfer.

There are several types of radiative equilibrium.

=== Prevost's definitions ===
An important early contribution was made by Pierre Prevost in 1791. Prevost considered that what is nowadays called the photon gas or electromagnetic radiation was a fluid that he called "free heat". Prevost proposed that free radiant heat is a very rare fluid, rays of which, like light rays, pass through each other without detectable disturbance of their passage. Prevost's theory of exchanges stated that each body radiates to, and receives radiation from, other bodies. The radiation from each body is emitted regardless of the presence or absence of other bodies.

Prevost in 1791 offered the following definitions (translated):

Absolute equilibrium of free heat is the state of this fluid in a portion of space which receives as much of it as it lets escape.

Relative equilibrium of free heat is the state of this fluid in two portions of space which receive from each other equal quantities of heat, and which moreover are in absolute equilibrium, or experience precisely equal changes.

Prevost went on to comment that "The heat of several portions of space at the same temperature, and next to one another, is at the same time in the two species of equilibrium."

=== Pointwise radiative equilibrium ===
Following Max Planck (1914), a radiative field is often described in terms of specific radiative intensity, which is a function of each geometrical point in a space region, at an instant of time. This is slightly different from Prevost's mode of definition, which was for regions of space. It is also slightly conceptually different from Prevost's definition: Prevost thought in terms of bound and free heat while today we think in terms of heat in kinetic and other dynamic energy of molecules, that is to say heat in matter, and the thermal photon gas. A detailed definition is given by R. M. Goody and Y. L. Yung (1989). They think of the interconversion between thermal radiation and heat in matter. From the specific radiative intensity they derive $\mathbf{F}_\nu$, the monochromatic vector flux density of radiation at each point in a region of space, which is equal to the time averaged monochromatic Poynting vector at that point (D. Mihalas 1978 on pages 9–11). They define the monochromatic volume-specific rate of gain of heat by matter from radiation as the negative of the divergence of the monochromatic flux density vector; it is a scalar function of the position of the point:

$$h_\nu = - \nabla \cdot \mathbf{F}_\nu$$.

They define (pointwise) monochromatic radiative equilibrium by

$\nabla \cdot \mathbf{F}_\nu = 0$ at every point of the region that is in radiative equilibrium.

They define (pointwise) radiative equilibrium by

$h = \int_0^{\infty} h_\nu d\nu = 0$ at every point of the region that is in radiative equilibrium.

This means that, at every point of the region of space that is in (pointwise) radiative equilibrium, the total, for all frequencies of radiation, interconversion of energy between thermal radiation and energy content in matter is nil(zero). Pointwise radiative equilibrium is closely related to Prevost's absolute radiative equilibrium.

D. Mihalas and B. Weibel-Mihalas (1984) emphasise that this definition applies to a static medium, in which the matter is not moving. They also consider moving media.

==== Approximate pointwise radiative equilibrium ====
Karl Schwarzschild in 1906 considered a system in which convection and radiation both operated but radiation was so much more efficient than convection that convection could be, as an approximation, neglected, and radiation could be considered predominant. This applies when the temperature is very high, as for example in a star, but not in a planet's atmosphere.

Subrahmanyan Chandrasekhar (1950, page 290) writes of a model of a stellar atmosphere in which "there are no mechanisms, other than radiation, for transporting heat within the atmosphere ... [and] there are no sources of heat in the surrounding" This is hardly different from Schwarzschild's 1906 approximate concept, but is more precisely stated.

=== Radiative exchange equilibrium ===
Planck (1914, page 40) refers to a condition of thermodynamic equilibrium, in which "any two bodies or elements of bodies selected at random exchange by radiation equal amounts of heat with each other."

The term radiative exchange equilibrium can also be used to refer to two specified regions of space that exchange equal amounts of radiation by emission and absorption (even when the steady state is not one of thermodynamic equilibrium, but is one in which some sub-processes include net transport of matter or energy including radiation). Radiative exchange equilibrium is very nearly the same as Prevost's relative radiative equilibrium.

==== Approximate radiative exchange equilibrium ====
To a first approximation, an example of radiative exchange equilibrium is in the exchange of non-window wavelength thermal radiation between the land-and-sea surface and the lowest atmosphere, when there is a clear sky. As a first approximation (W. C. Swinbank 1963, G. W. Paltridge and C. M. R. Platt 1976, pages 139–140), in the non-window wavenumbers, there is zero net exchange between the surface and the atmosphere, while, in the window wavenumbers, there is simply direct radiation from the land-sea surface to space. A like situation occurs between adjacent layers in the turbulently mixed boundary layer of the lower troposphere, expressed in the so-called "cooling to space approximation", first noted by C. D. Rodgers and C. D. Walshaw (1966).

== In astronomy and planetary science ==
=== Global radiative equilibrium ===
Global radiative equilibrium can be defined for an entire passive celestial system that does not supply its own energy, such as a planet.

Liou (2002, page 459) and other authors use the term global radiative equilibrium to refer to radiative exchange equilibrium globally between Earth and extraterrestrial space; such authors intend to mean that, in the theoretical, incoming solar radiation absorbed by Earth's surface and its atmosphere would be equal to outgoing longwave radiation from Earth's surface and its atmosphere. Prevost would say then that the Earth's surface and its atmosphere regarded as a whole were in absolute radiative equilibrium. Some texts, for example Satoh (2004), simply refer to "radiative equilibrium" in referring to global exchange radiative equilibrium.

=== Planetary equilibrium temperature ===
The various global temperatures that may be theoretically conceived for any planet in general can be computed. Such temperatures include the planetary equilibrium temperature, equivalent blackbody temperature or effective radiation emission temperature of the planet. For a planet with an atmosphere, these temperatures can be different than the mean surface temperature, which may be measured as the global-mean surface air temperature, or as the global-mean surface skin temperature.

A radiative equilibrium temperature is calculated for the case that the supply of energy from within the planet (for example, from chemical or nuclear sources) is negligibly small; this assumption is reasonable for Earth, but fails, for example, for calculating the temperature of Jupiter, for which internal energy sources are larger than the incident solar radiation, and hence the actual temperature is higher than the theoretical radiative equilibrium.

=== Stellar equilibrium ===
A star supplies its own energy from nuclear sources, and hence the temperature equilibrium cannot be defined in terms of incident energy only.

Cox and Giuli (1968/1984) define 'radiative equilibrium' for a star, taken as a whole and not confining attention only to its atmosphere, when the rate of transfer as heat of energy from nuclear reactions plus viscosity to the microscopic motions of the material particles of the star is just balanced by the transfer of energy by electromagnetic radiation from the star to space. Note that this radiative equilibrium is slightly different from the previous usage. They note that a star that is radiating energy to space cannot be in a steady state of temperature distribution unless there is a supply of energy, in this case, energy from nuclear reactions within the star, to support the radiation to space. Likewise the condition that is used for the above definition of pointwise radiative equilibrium cannot hold throughout a star that is radiating: internally, the star is in a steady state of temperature distribution, not internal thermodynamic equilibrium. Cox and Giuli's definition allows them to say at the same time that a star is in a steady state of temperature distribution and is in 'radiative equilibrium'; they are assuming that all the radiative energy to space comes from within the star.

== Mechanisms ==
When there is enough matter in a region to allow molecular collisions to occur very much more often than absorption or emission of photons, for radiation one speaks of local thermodynamic equilibrium (LTE). In this case, Kirchhoff's law of equality of radiative absorptivity and emissivity holds.

Two bodies in radiative exchange equilibrium, each in its own local thermodynamic equilibrium, have the same temperature and their radiative exchange complies with the Stokes-Helmholtz reciprocity principle.
