= Pre-main-sequence star =

Star in the stage when it has not yet reached the main sequence

A pre-main-sequence star (also known as a PMS star and PMS object) is a star in the stage when it has not yet reached the main sequence. Earlier in its life, the object is a protostar that grows by acquiring mass from its surrounding envelope of interstellar dust and gas. After the protostar blows away this envelope, it is optically visible, and appears on the stellar birthline in the Hertzsprung-Russell diagram. At this point, the star has acquired nearly all of its mass but has not yet started hydrogen burning (i.e. nuclear fusion of hydrogen). The star continues to contract, its internal temperature rising until it begins hydrogen burning on the zero age main sequence. This period of contraction is the pre-main sequence stage.

An observed PMS object can either be a T Tauri star, if it has fewer than 2 solar masses (M_{☉}), or else a Herbig Ae/Be star, if it has 2 to 8 M_{☉}. Yet more massive stars may have no observable pre-main-sequence stage because they contract too quickly as protostars and are surrounded by circumstellar gas. By the time they become visible, the hydrogen in their centers is already fusing and they are main-sequence objects. The creation of large reflecting telescopes has made it possible to study massive young stellar objects (YSOs), which include protostars and PMS stars.

The energy source of PMS objects is gravitational contraction and deuterium fusion, as opposed to hydrogen burning in main-sequence stars. In the Hertzsprung–Russell diagram, pre-main-sequence stars with more than 0.5 M_{☉} first move vertically downward along Hayashi tracks as protostars, then leftward and horizontally along Henyey tracks until they finally halt at the main sequence. Pre-main-sequence stars with less than 0.5 M_{☉} contract vertically along the Hayashi track for their entire evolution.

PMS stars can be differentiated empirically from main-sequence stars by using stellar spectra to measure their surface gravity. A PMS object has a larger radius than a main-sequence star with the same stellar mass and thus has a lower surface gravity. Although they are optically visible, PMS objects are rare relative to those on the main sequence, because their contraction lasts for only 1 percent of the lifetime of hydrogen fusion. During the early portion of the PMS stage, most stars have circumstellar disks, which are the sites of planet formation.

== See also ==
- Protoplanetary disk
- Protostar
- Stellar evolution
- Young stellar object
