= T Tauri star =

Class of young variable stars

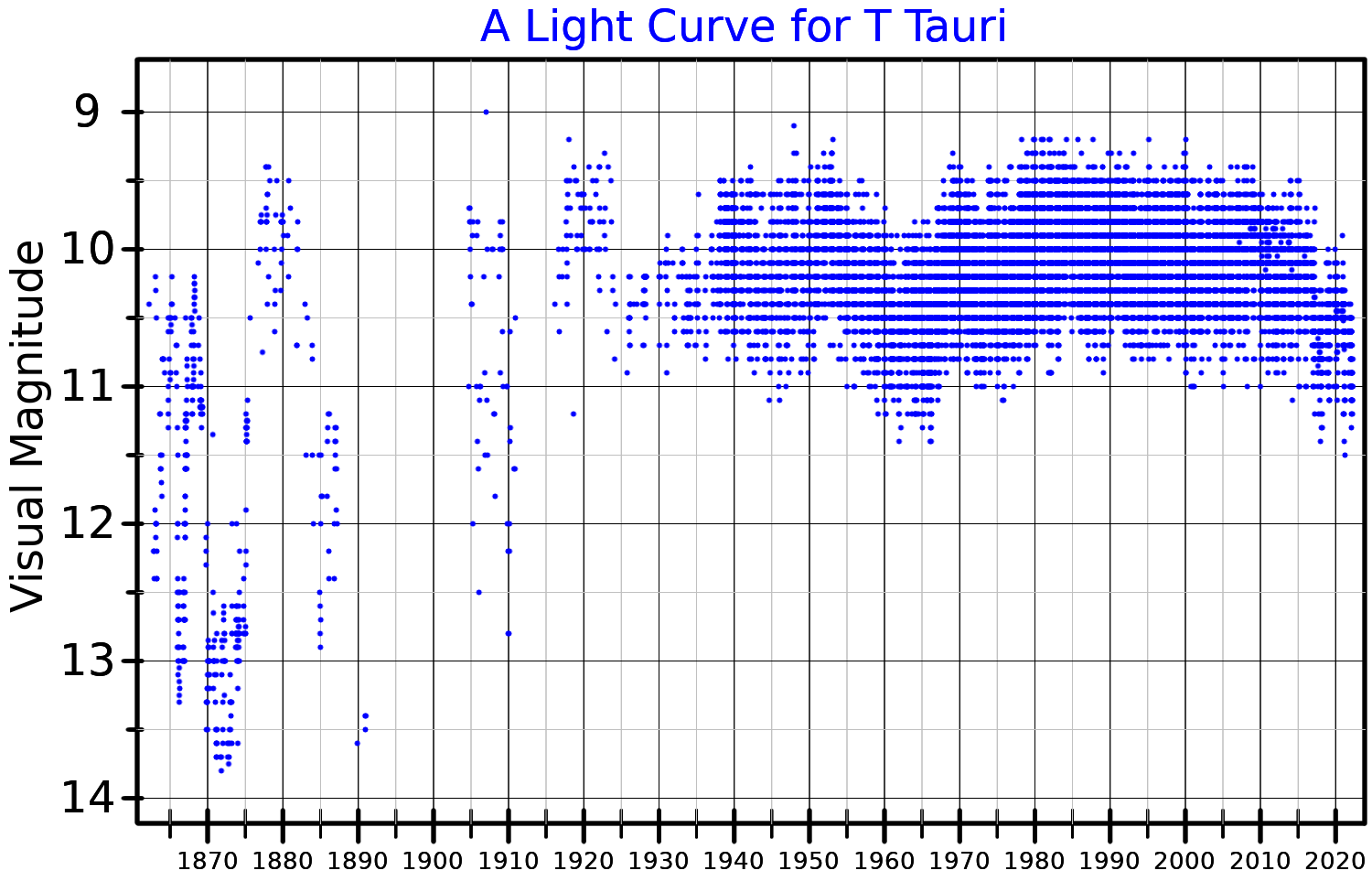
A 160 year long visual band light curve for T Tauri, the prototype for the class, plotted from AAVSO data

T Tauri stars (TTS) are a class of variable stars that are less than about ten million years old. This class is named after the prototype, T Tauri, a young star in the Taurus star-forming region. They are found near molecular clouds and identified by their optical variability and strong chromospheric lines. T Tauri stars are pre-main-sequence stars in the process of contracting to the main sequence along the Hayashi track, a luminosity–temperature relationship obeyed by infant stars of less than 3 solar masses (M_{☉}) in the pre-main-sequence phase of stellar evolution. It ends when a star of 0.5 M_{☉} or larger develops a radiative zone, or when a smaller star commences nuclear fusion on the main sequence.

== History ==
While T Tauri itself was discovered in 1852, the T Tauri class of stars were initially defined by Alfred Harrison Joy in 1945.

== Characteristics ==
T Tauri stars comprise the youngest visible F, G, K and M spectral type stars (<2 M_{☉}). Their surface temperatures are similar to those of main-sequence stars of the same mass, but they are significantly more luminous because their radii are larger. Their central temperatures are too low for hydrogen fusion. Instead, they are powered by gravitational energy released as the stars contract, while moving towards the main sequence, which they reach after about 100 million years. They typically rotate with a period between one and twelve days, compared to a month for the Sun, and are very active and variable.

There is evidence of large areas of starspot coverage, and they have intense and variable X-ray and radio emissions (approximately 1000 times that of the Sun). Many have extremely powerful stellar winds; some eject gas in high-velocity bipolar jets. Another source of brightness variability are clumps (protoplanets and planetesimals) in the disk surrounding T Tauri stars.

The ejection of a bubble of hot gas from XZ Tauri, a binary system of T Tauri stars. The scale is much larger than that of the Solar System.

Their spectra show a higher lithium abundance than the Sun and other main-sequence stars because lithium is destroyed at temperatures above 2,500,000 K. From a study of lithium abundances in 53 T Tauri stars, it has been found that lithium depletion varies strongly with size, suggesting that "lithium burning" by the p-p chain during the last highly convective and unstable stages during the later pre–main sequence phase of the Hayashi contraction may be one of the main sources of energy for T Tauri stars. Rapid rotation tends to improve mixing and increase the transport of lithium into deeper layers where it is destroyed. T Tauri stars generally increase their rotation rates as they age, through contraction and spin-up, as they conserve angular momentum. This causes an increased rate of lithium loss with age. Lithium burning will also increase with higher temperatures and mass, and will last for at most a little over 100 million years.

The p-p chain for lithium burning is as follows

p	+	^{6}_{3}Li	→	^{7}_{4}Be
^{7}_{4}Be	+	e^{−}	→	^{7}_{3}Li	+ ν_{e}
p	+	^{7}_{3}Li	→	^{8}_{4}Be		(unstable)
		^{8}_{4}Be	→	2 ^{4}_{2}He	+ energy

It will not occur in stars with less than sixty times the mass of Jupiter (M_{J}). The rate of lithium depletion can be used to calculate the age of the star.

== Types ==
Several types of TTSs exist:

- Classical T Tauri star (CTTS)
- Weak-line T Tauri star (WTTS)
  - Naked T Tauri star (NTTS), which is a subset of WTTS.

Roughly half of T Tauri stars have circumstellar disks, which in this case are called protoplanetary discs because they are probably the progenitors of planetary systems like the Solar System. Circumstellar discs are estimated to dissipate on timescales of up to 10 million years. Most T Tauri stars are in binary star systems. In various stages of their life, they are called young stellar object (YSOs). It is thought that the active magnetic fields and strong solar wind of Alfvén waves of T Tauri stars are one means by which angular momentum gets transferred from the star to the protoplanetary disc. A T Tauri stage for the Solar System would be one means by which the angular momentum of the contracting Sun was transferred to the protoplanetary disc and hence, eventually to the planets.

Analogs of T Tauri stars in the higher mass range (2–8 solar masses)—A and B spectral type pre–main-sequence stars, are called Herbig Ae/Be-type stars. More massive (>8 solar masses) stars in pre–main sequence stage are not observed, because they evolve very quickly: when they become visible (i.e. disperses surrounding circumstellar gas and dust cloud), the hydrogen in the center is already burning and they are main sequence objects.

== Planets ==
Planets around T Tauri stars include:

- 1RXS J160929.1−210524b around a K-type star
- PDS 70b around a K-type star

== See also ==
- Orion variable
- EX Lupi
- P Cygni profile
