= Spitzer Space Telescope =

NASA infrared space telescope (2003–2020)

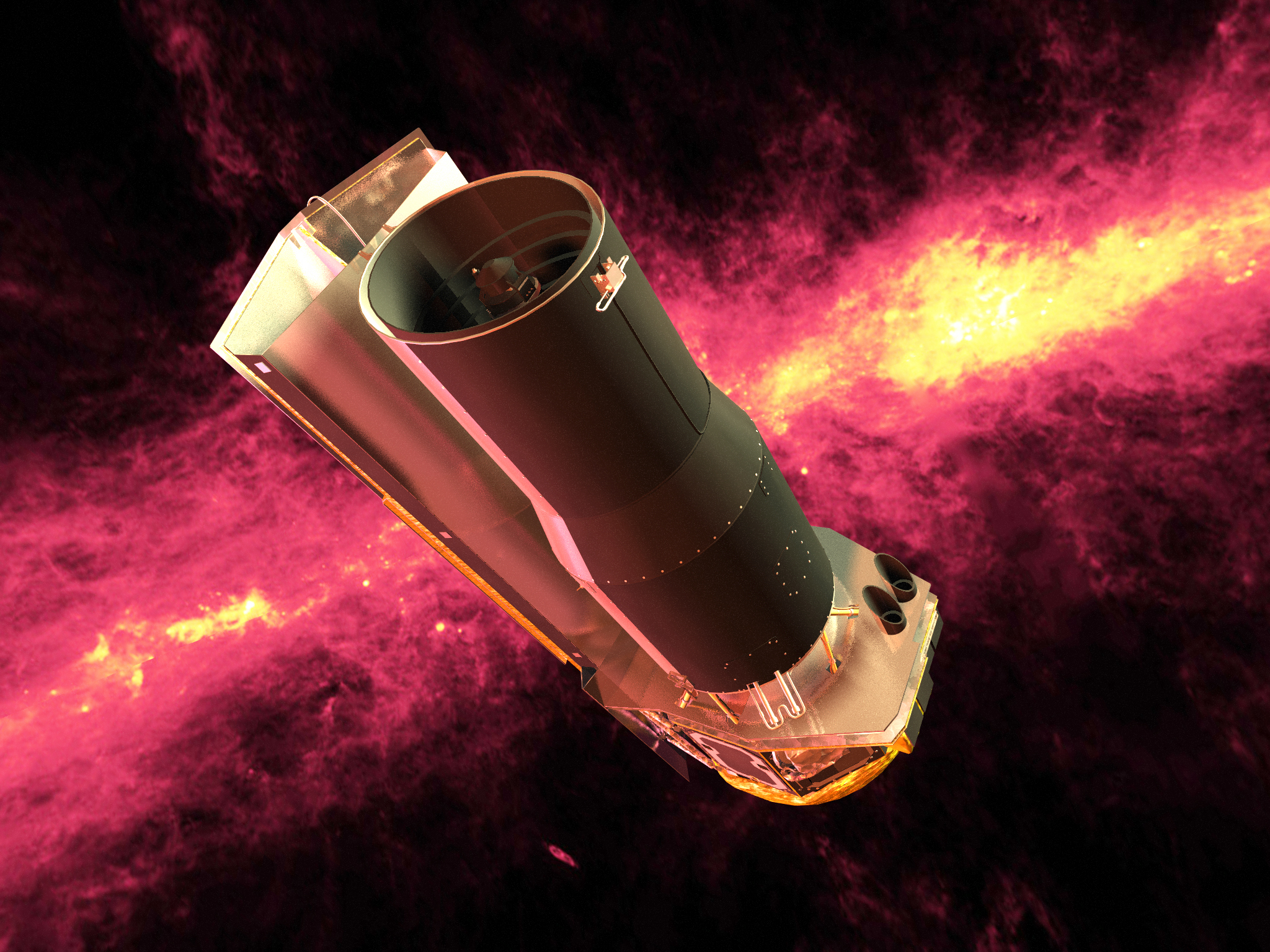
- An artist rendering of the Spitzer Space Telescope
- Names: Space Infrared Telescope Facility
- Mission type: Infrared space telescope
- Operator: NASA / JPL / Caltech
- COSPAR ID: 2003-038A
- SATCAT no.: 27871
- Website: www.spitzer.caltech.edu
- Mission duration: Planned: 2.5 to 5+ years Primary mission: 5 years, 8 months, 19 days Final: 16 years, 5 months, 4 days

Spacecraft properties
- Manufacturer: Lockheed; Ball Aerospace
- Launch mass: 950 kg (2,094 lb)
- Dry mass: 884 kg (1,949 lb)
- Payload mass: 851.5 kg (1,877 lb)
- Power: 427 W

Start of mission
- Launch date: 25 August 2003, 05:35:39 UTC
- Rocket: Delta II 7920H
- Launch site: Cape Canaveral SLC-17B
- Entered service: 18 December 2003

End of mission
- Disposal: Deactivated in Earth-trailing orbit
- Deactivated: 30 January 2020

Orbital parameters
- Reference system: Heliocentric
- Regime: Earth-trailing
- Eccentricity: 0.011
- Perihelion altitude: 1.003 AU
- Aphelion altitude: 1.026 AU
- Inclination: 1.13°
- Period: 373.2 days
- Epoch: 16 March 2017 00:00:00

Main telescope
- Type: Ritchey–Chrétien
- Diameter: 0.85 m (2.8 ft)
- Focal length: 10.2 m (33 ft)
- Wavelengths: infrared, 3.6–160 μm
Instruments
- IRAC: Infrared Array Camera
- IRS: Infrared Spectrograph
- MIPS: Multiband Imaging Photometer for Spitzer
- NASA Great Observatories

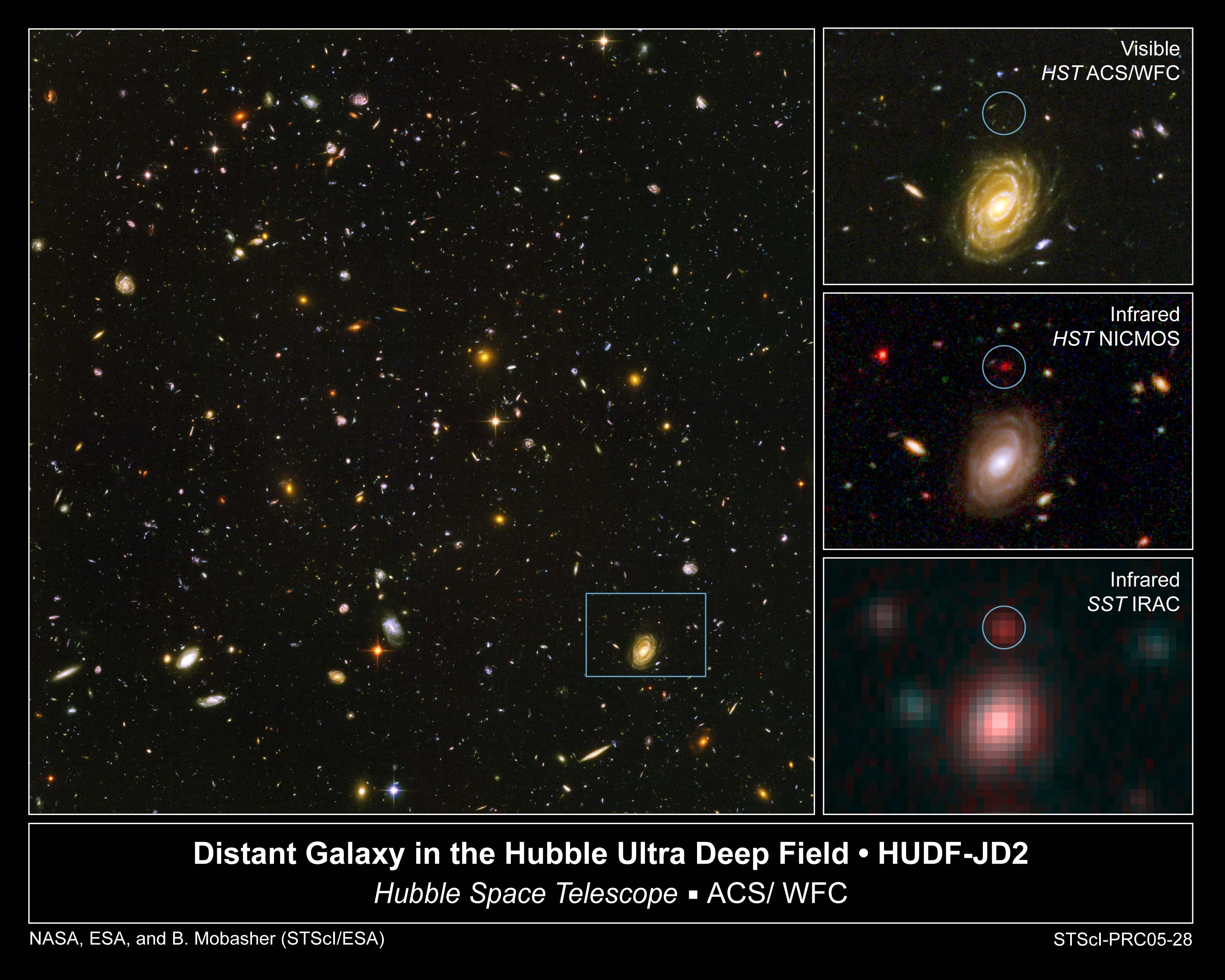
Infrared observations can see objects hidden in visible light, such as HUDF-JD2, shown. This shows how the Spitzer IRAC camera was able to see beyond the wavelengths of Hubble's instruments.

The Spitzer Space Telescope, formerly the Space Infrared Telescope Facility (SIRTF), was an infrared space telescope that was active between 2003 and 2020. Spitzer was the third space telescope dedicated to infrared astronomy, following IRAS (1983) and ISO (1995–1998). It was the first spacecraft to use an Earth-trailing orbit, later used by the Kepler planet-finder telescope.

The planned mission period was to be 2.5 years with a pre-launch expectation that the mission could extend to five or slightly more years until the onboard liquid helium supply was exhausted. This occurred on 15 May 2009. Without liquid helium to cool the telescope to the very low temperatures needed to operate, most of the instruments were no longer usable. However, the two shortest-wavelength modules of the IRAC camera continued to operate with the same sensitivity as before the helium was exhausted, and continued to be used into early 2020 in the Spitzer Warm Mission.

During the warm mission, the two short wavelength channels of IRAC operated at 28.7 K and were predicted to experience little to no degradation at this temperature compared to the nominal mission. The Spitzer data, from both the primary and warm phases, are archived at the Infrared Science Archive (IRSA).

In keeping with NASA tradition, the telescope was renamed after its successful demonstration of operation, on 18 December 2003. Unlike most telescopes that are named by a board of scientists, typically after famous deceased astronomers, the new name for SIRTF was obtained from a contest open to the general public. The contest led to the telescope being named in honor of astronomer Lyman Spitzer, who had promoted the concept of space telescopes in the 1940s. Spitzer wrote a 1946 report for the RAND Corporation describing the advantages of an extraterrestrial observatory and how it could be realized with available or upcoming technology. He has been cited for his pioneering contributions to rocketry and astronomy, as well as "his vision and leadership in articulating the advantages and benefits to be realized from the Space Telescope Program."

The US$776 million Spitzer was launched on 25 August 2003 at 05:35:39 UTC from Cape Canaveral SLC-17B aboard a Delta II 7920H rocket. It was placed into a heliocentric (as opposed to a geocentric) orbit trailing and drifting away from Earth's orbit at approximately 0.1 astronomical units per year (an "Earth-trailing" orbit).

The primary mirror is 85 centimeters (33 in) in diameter, f/12, made of beryllium and was cooled to 5.5 K (−268 °C; −450 °F). The satellite contains three instruments that allowed it to perform astronomical imaging and photometry from 3.6 to 160 micrometers, spectroscopy from 5.2 to 38 micrometers, and spectrophotometry from 55 to 95 micrometers.

== History ==
Rough plot of Earth's atmospheric transmittance (or opacity) to various wavelengths of electromagnetic radiation, including visible light.

By the early 1970s, astronomers began to consider the possibility of placing an infrared telescope above the obscuring effects of Earth's atmosphere. Most of the infrared spectrum is outside the optical window, meaning they are strongly absorbed by the atmosphere, except for the infrared window.

In 1979, a report from the National Research Council of the National Academy of Sciences, A Strategy for Space Astronomy and Astrophysics for the 1980s, identified a Shuttle Infrared Telescope Facility (SIRTF) as "one of two major astrophysics facilities [to be developed] for Spacelab", a shuttle-borne platform. Anticipating the major results from an upcoming Explorer satellite and from the Shuttle mission, the report also favored the "study and development of ... long-duration spaceflights of infrared telescopes cooled to cryogenic temperatures."

The launch in January 1983 of the Infrared Astronomical Satellite (IRAS), jointly developed by the United States, the Netherlands, and the United Kingdom, to conduct the first far-infrared survey of the sky, whetted the appetites of scientists worldwide for follow-up space missions capitalizing on the rapid improvements in infrared detector technology.

Earlier infrared observations had been made by both space-based and ground-based observatories. Ground-based observatories have the drawback that at infrared wavelengths or frequencies, both the Earth's atmosphere and the telescope itself will radiate (glow) brightly. Additionally, the atmosphere is opaque at most infrared wavelengths. This necessitates lengthy exposure times and greatly decreases the ability to detect faint objects. It could be compared to trying to observe the stars in visible light at noon from a telescope built out of light bulbs. Previous space observatories (such as IRAS, the Infrared Astronomical Satellite, and ISO, the Infrared Space Observatory) were launched during the 1980s and 1990s and great advances in astronomical technology have been made since then.

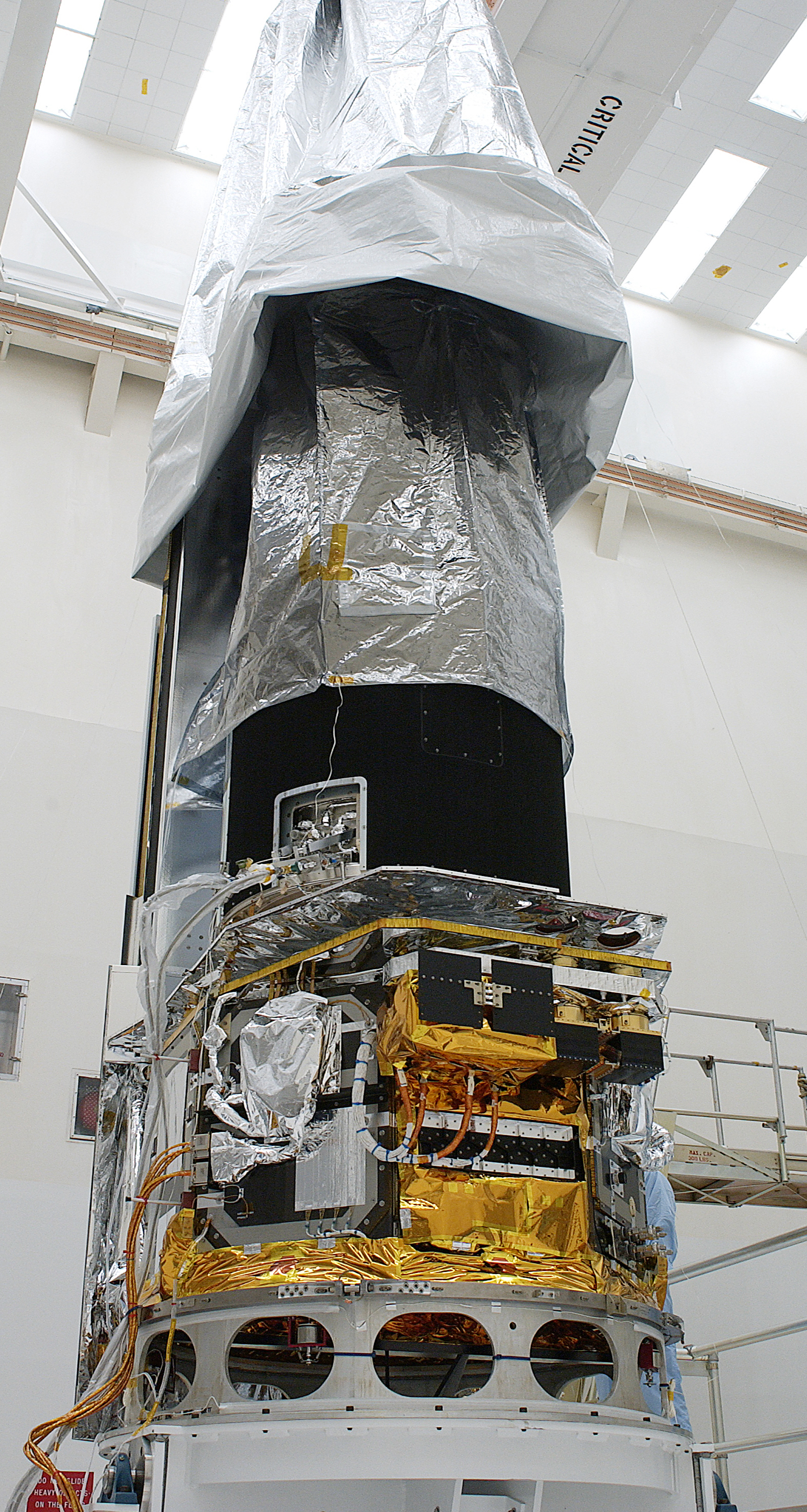
The SIRTF in a Kennedy Space Center clean room.

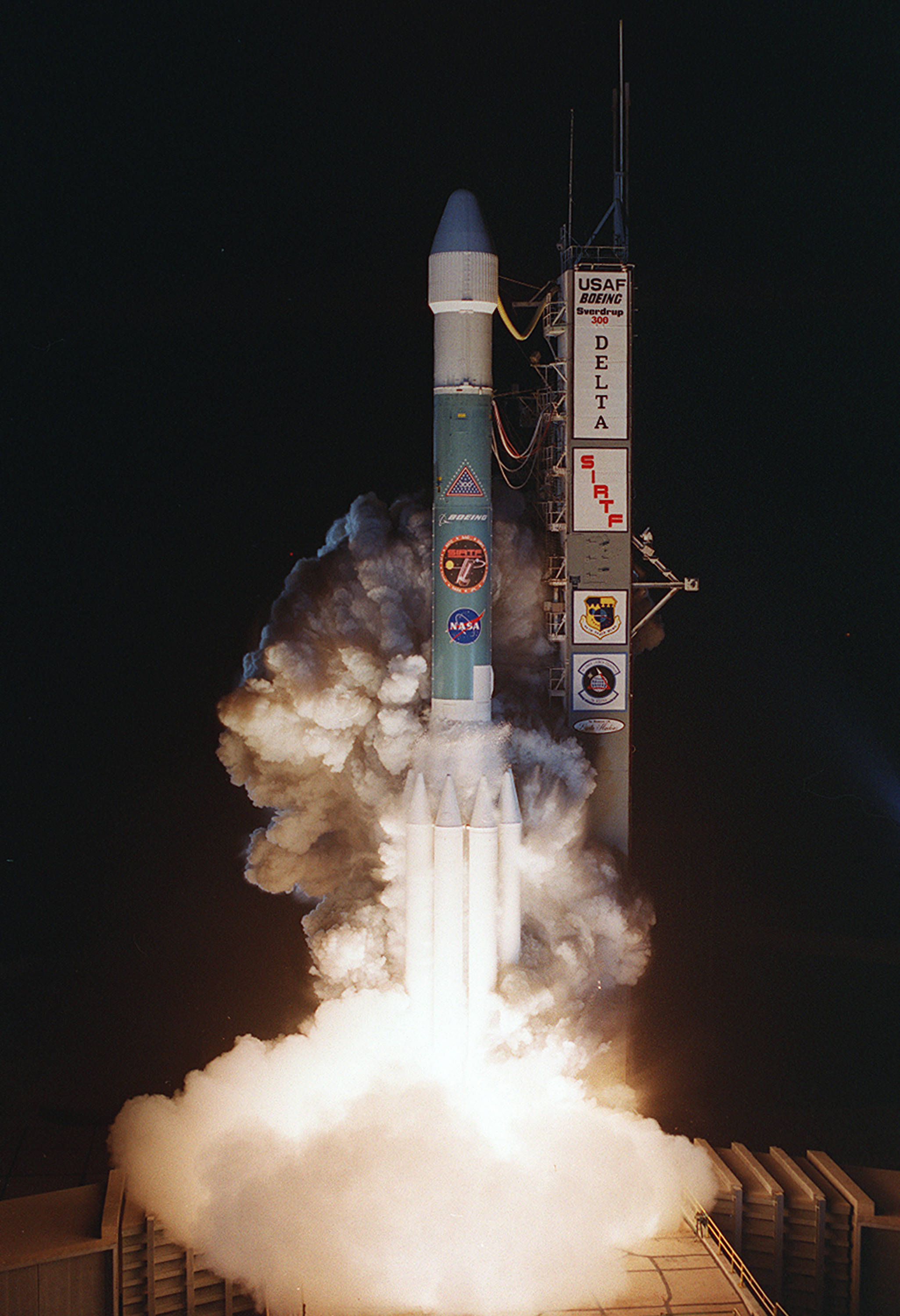
The launch of SIRTF in 2003 aboard the 300th Delta rocket.

Most of the early concepts envisioned repeated flights aboard the NASA Space Shuttle. This approach was developed in an era when the Shuttle program was expected to support weekly flights of up to 30 days duration. A May 1983 NASA Announcement of Opportunity described SIRTF as a Shuttle-attached mission with an evolving scientific instrument payload. Several flights were anticipated with a probable transition into a more extended mode of operation, possibly in association with a future space platform or space station. SIRTF would be a 1-meter class, cryogenically cooled, multi-user facility consisting of a telescope and associated focal plane instruments mounted on a general-purpose Instrument Pointing System to be developed by NASA Ames. SIRTF would be launched on the Space Shuttle and remain attached to the Shuttle as a Spacelab payload during astronomical observations, after which it would be returned to Earth for refurbishment prior to re-flight. The first flight was expected to occur about 1990 with the succeeding flights anticipated beginning approximately one year later. However, the Spacelab-2 flight aboard STS-51-F showed that the Shuttle environment was poorly suited to an onboard infrared telescope due to contamination from the relatively "dirty" vacuum associated with the orbiters. By September 1983, NASA was considering the "possibility of a long duration [free-flyer] SIRTF mission".

Spitzer is the only one of the Great Observatories not launched by the Space Shuttle, as was originally intended. However, after the 1986 Challenger disaster, the Shuttle-Centaur upper stage, which would have been required to place it into its final orbit, was abandoned. The mission underwent a series of redesigns during the 1990s, primarily due to budget considerations. This resulted in a much smaller but still fully capable mission that could use the smaller Delta II expendable launch vehicle.

Animation of Spitzer Space Telescope

Around the Earth

Around the Sun - Frame rotating with the Earth

Spitzer Space Telescope · Earth · Sun

One of the most important advances of this redesign was an Earth-trailing orbit. Cryogenic satellites that require liquid helium (LHe, T ≈ 4 K) temperatures in near-Earth orbit are typically exposed to a large heat load from Earth, and consequently require large amounts of LHe coolant, which then tends to dominate the total payload mass and limits mission life. Placing the satellite in solar orbit far from Earth allowed innovative passive cooling. The sun shield protected the rest of the spacecraft from the Sun's heat, the far side of the spacecraft was painted black to enhance passive radiation of heat, and the spacecraft bus was thermally isolated from the telescope. All of these design choices combined to drastically reduce the total mass of helium needed, resulting in an overall smaller and lighter payload, leading to major cost savings, but with a mirror the same diameter as originally designed. This orbit also simplified telescope pointing, but did require the NASA Deep Space Network for communications.

The primary instrument package (telescope and cryogenic chamber) was developed by Ball Aerospace & Technologies, in Boulder, Colorado. The individual instruments were developed jointly by industrial, academic, and government institutions. The principals were Cornell University, the University of Arizona, the Smithsonian Astrophysical Observatory, Ball Aerospace, and Goddard Spaceflight Center. The shorter-wavelength infrared detectors were developed by Raytheon in Goleta, California. Raytheon used indium antimonide and a doped silicon detector in the creation of the infrared detectors. These detectors are 100 times more sensitive than what was available at the beginning of the project during the 1980s. The far-infrared detectors (70–160 micrometers) were developed jointly by the University of Arizona and Lawrence Berkeley National Laboratory using gallium-doped germanium. The spacecraft was built by Lockheed Martin. The mission was operated and managed by the Jet Propulsion Laboratory and the Spitzer Science Center, located at IPAC on the Caltech campus in Pasadena, California.

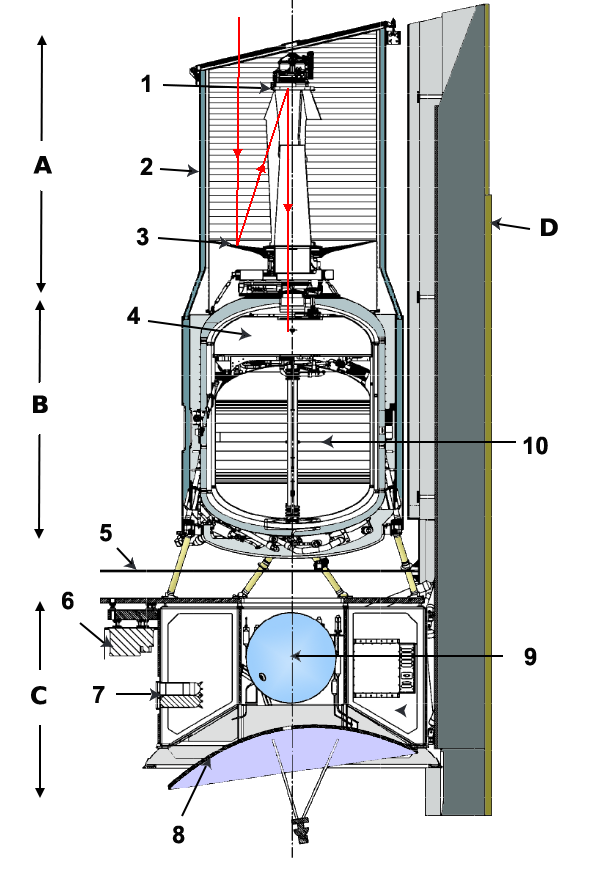
Schematic view of Spitzer: A Optics : 1 - secondary mirror; 3 - primary mirror; 2 - outer shell; B Cryostat: 4 - instruments; 10 - helium tank; C Service module: 5 - service module shield; 6 - star tracker; 7 - batteries; 8 - high-gain antenna; 9 - nitrogen tank; D Solar panels

=== Warm mission and end of mission ===
Spitzer ran out of liquid helium coolant on 15 May 2009, which stopped far-IR observations. Only the IRAC instrument remained in use, and only at the two shorter wavelength bands (3.6 μm and 4.5 μm). The telescope equilibrium temperature was then around 30 K (−243 °C; −406 °F), and IRAC continued to produce valuable images at those wavelengths as the "Spitzer Warm Mission".

Late in the mission, ~2016, Spitzer's distance to Earth and the shape of its orbit meant the spacecraft had to pitch over at an extreme angle to aim its antenna at Earth. The solar panels were not fully illuminated at this angle, and this limited those communications to 2.5 hours due to the battery drain. The telescope was retired on 30 January 2020 when NASA sent a shutdown signal to the telescope from the Goldstone Deep Space Communications Complex (GDSCC) instructing the telescope to go into safe mode. After receiving confirmation that the command was successful, Spitzer Project Manager Joseph Hunt officially declared that the mission had ended.

== Instruments ==
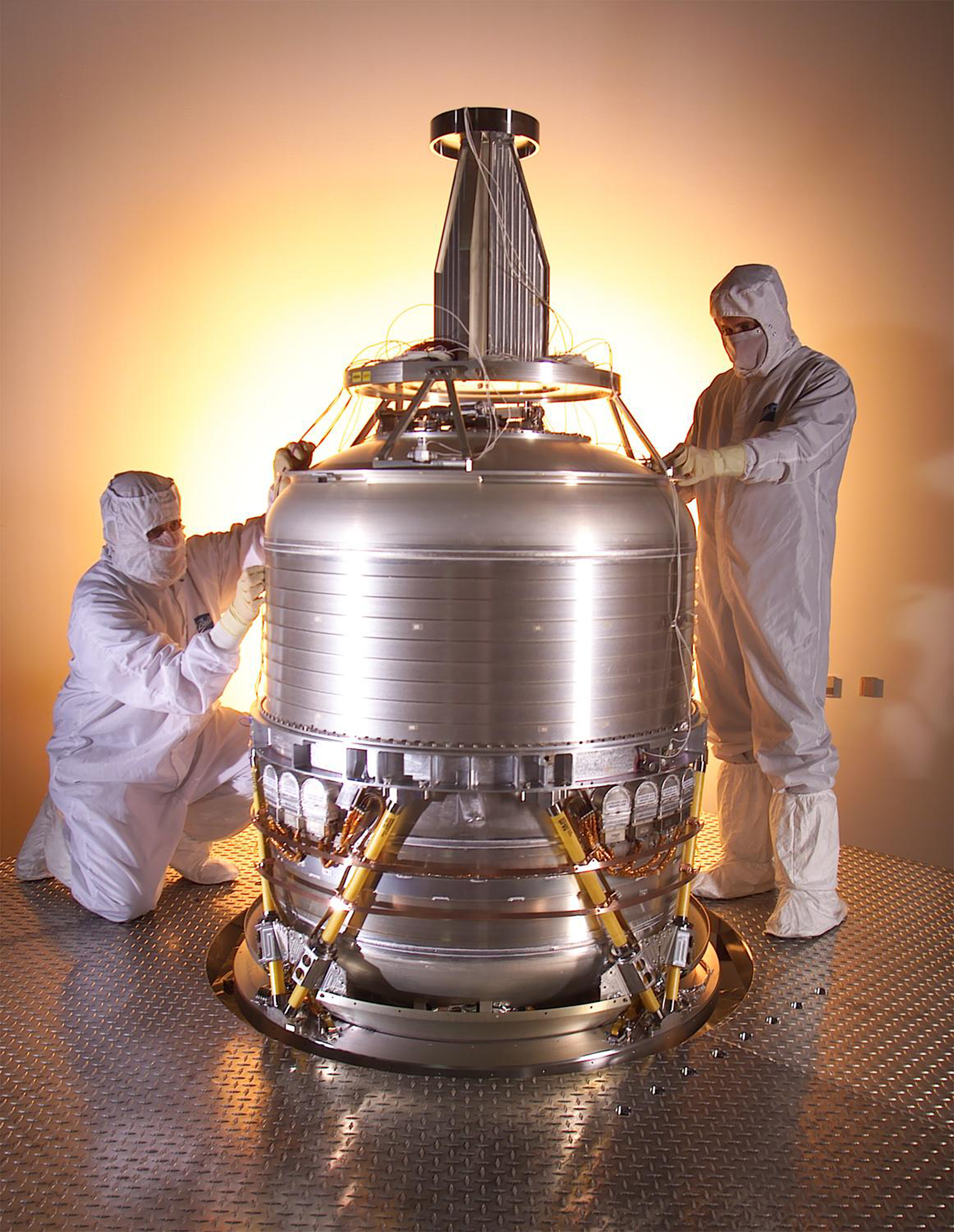
Cryogenic Telescope Assembly (CTA)

Spitzer carries three instruments on board:

Infrared Array Camera (IRAC)
An infrared camera which operated simultaneously on four wavelengths (3.6 μm, 4.5 μm, 5.8 μm and 8 μm). Each module used a 256×256-pixel detector—the short-wavelength pair used indium antimonide technology, the long-wavelength pair used arsenic-doped silicon impurity band conduction technology. The principal investigator was Giovanni Fazio of Center for Astrophysics | Harvard & Smithsonian; the flight hardware was built by NASA Goddard Space Flight Center.
Infrared Spectrograph (IRS)
An infrared spectrometer with four sub-modules which operate at the wavelengths 5.3–14 μm (low resolution), 10–19.5 μm (high resolution), 14–40 μm (low resolution), and 19–37 μm (high resolution). Each module used a 128×128-pixel detector—the short-wavelength pair used arsenic-doped silicon blocked impurity band technology, the long-wavelength pair used antimony-doped silicon blocked impurity band technology. The principal investigator was James R. Houck of Cornell University; the flight hardware was built by Ball Aerospace.
Multiband Imaging Photometer for Spitzer (MIPS)
Three detector arrays in the mid- to far-infrared (128 × 128 pixels at 24 μm, 32 × 32 pixels at 70 μm, 2 × 20 pixels at 160 μm). The 24 μm detector is identical to one of the IRS short-wavelength modules. The 70 μm detector used gallium-doped germanium technology, and the 160 μm detector also used gallium-doped germanium, but with mechanical stress added to each pixel to lower the bandgap and extend sensitivity to this long-wavelength. The principal investigator was George H. Rieke of the University of Arizona; the flight hardware was built by Ball Aerospace.

All three instruments used liquid helium for cooling the sensors. Once the helium was exhausted, only the two shorter wavelengths in IRAC were used in the "warm mission".

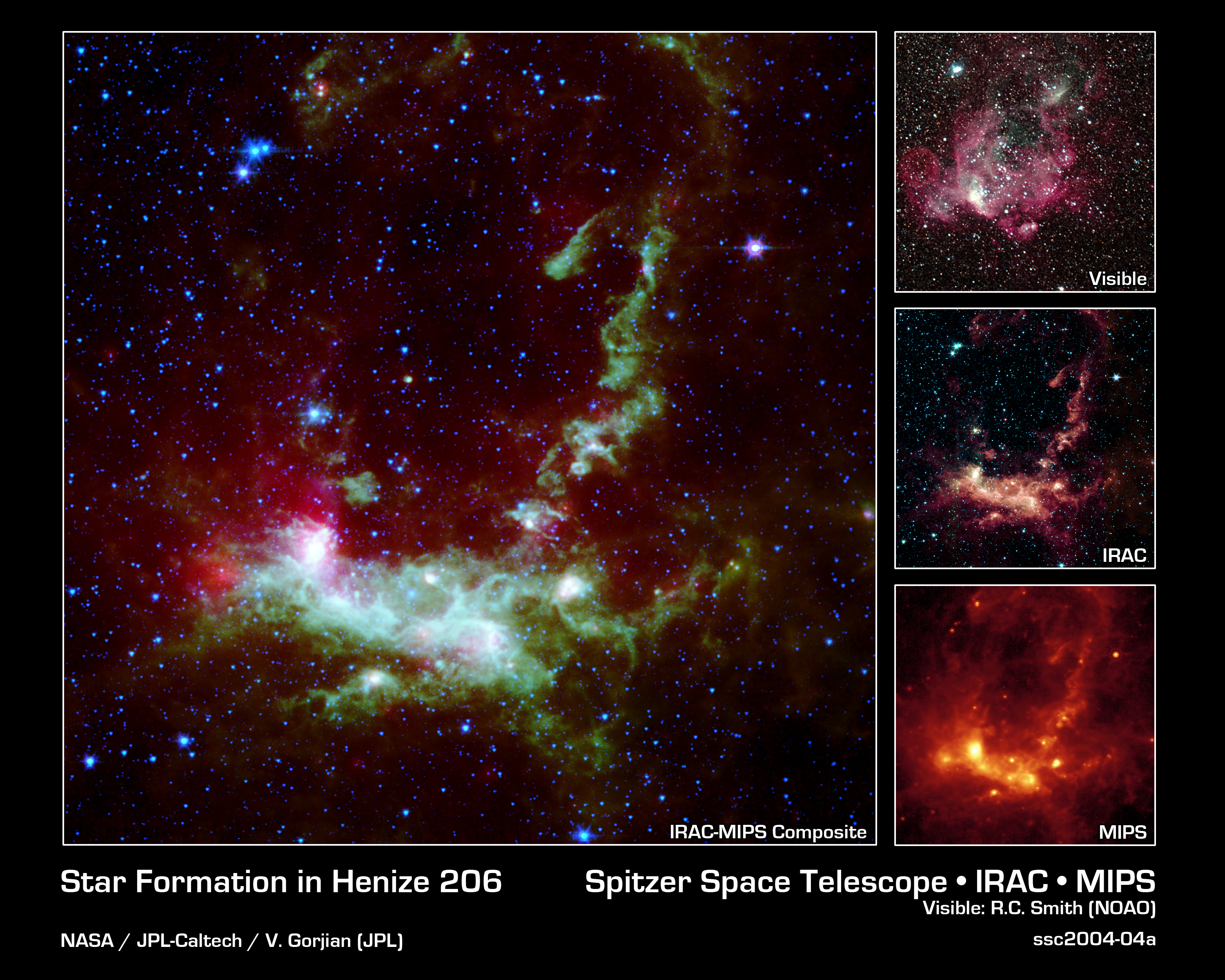
The Henize 206 nebula viewed by different instruments in March 2004. The separate IRAC and MIPS images are at right.

== Results ==
While some time on the telescope was reserved for participating institutions and crucial projects, astronomers around the world also had the opportunity to submit proposals for observing time. Prior to launch, there was a proposal call for large, coherent investigations using Spitzer. If the telescope failed early and/or ran out of cryogen very quickly, these so-called Legacy Projects would ensure the best possible science could be obtained quickly in the early months of the mission. As a requirement tied to the funding these Legacy teams received, the teams had to deliver high-level data products back to the Spitzer Science Center (and the NASA/IPAC Infrared Science Archive) for use by the community, again ensuring the rapid scientific return of the mission. The international scientific community quickly realized the value of delivering products for others to use, and even though Legacy projects were no longer explicitly solicited in subsequent proposal calls, teams continued to deliver products to the community. The Spitzer Science Center later reinstated named "Legacy" projects (and later still "Exploration Science" projects) in response to this community-driven effort.

Important targets included forming stars (young stellar objects, or YSOs), planets, and other galaxies. Images are freely available for educational and journalistic purposes.

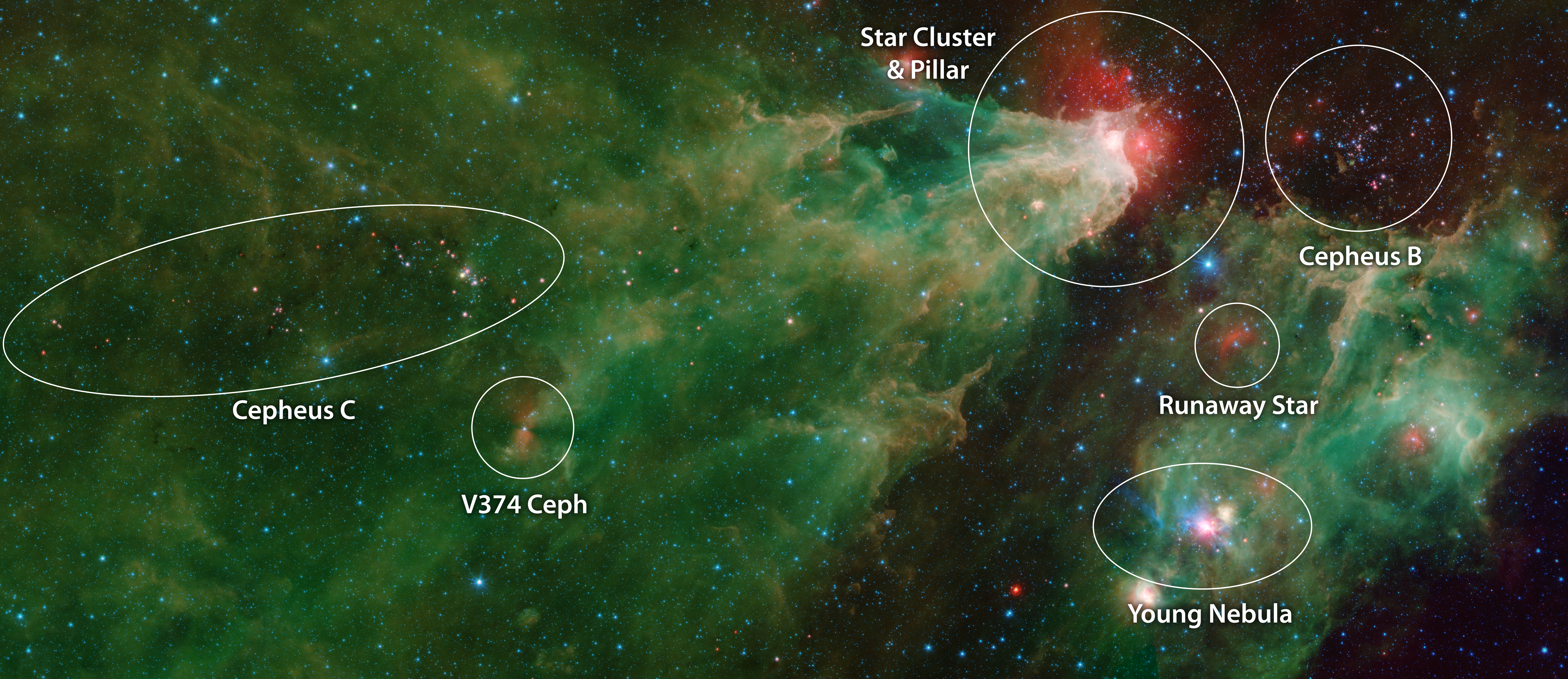
The Cepheus C & B Regions. – The Spitzer Space Telescope (30 May 2019).

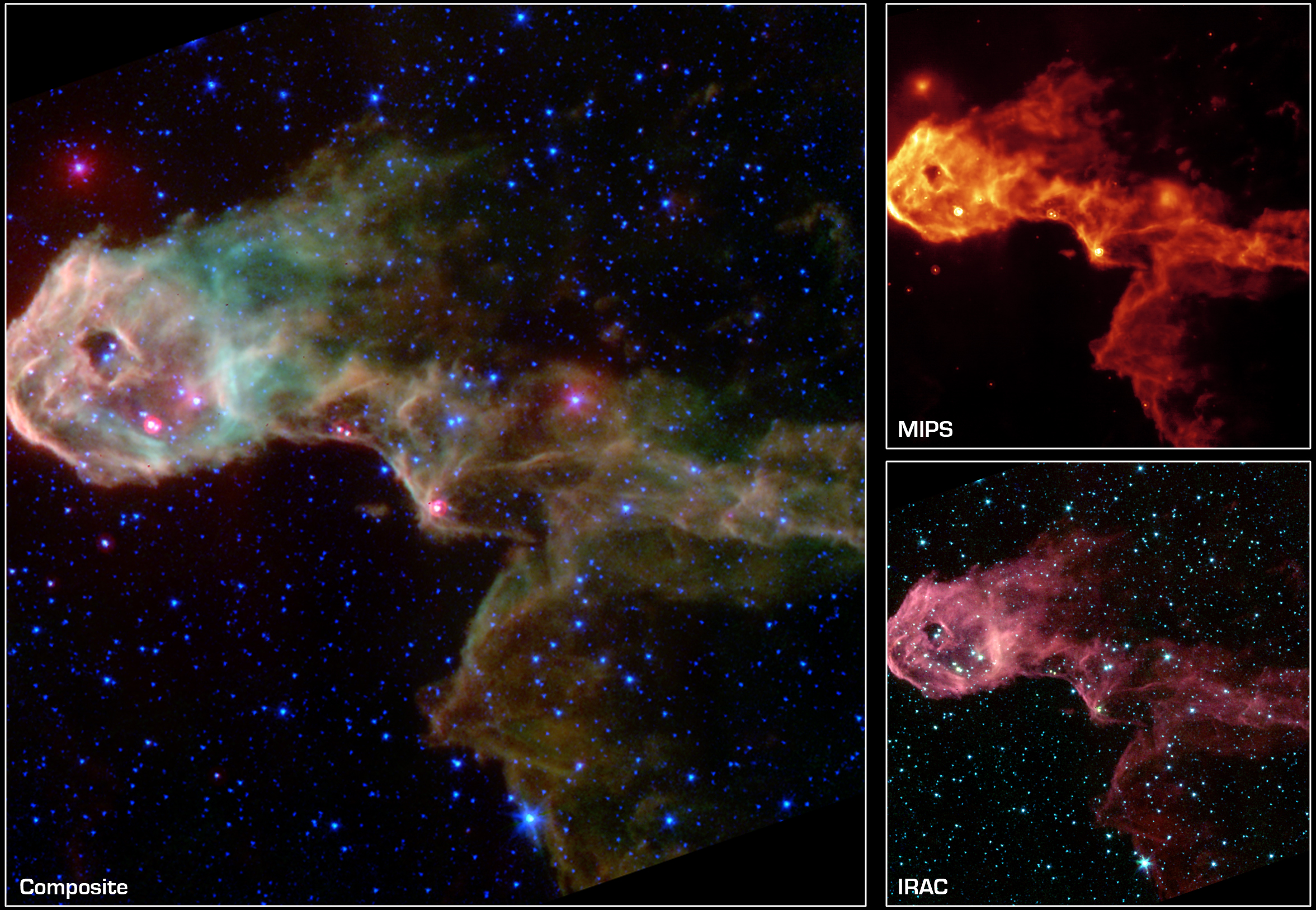
The Spitzer's first light image of IC 1396.

The first released images from Spitzer were designed to show off the abilities of the telescope and showed a glowing stellar nursery, a big swirling, dusty galaxy, a disc of planet-forming debris, and organic material in the distant universe. Since then, many monthly press releases have highlighted Spitzer's capabilities, as the NASA and ESA images do for the Hubble Space Telescope.

As one of its most noteworthy observations, in 2005, Spitzer became one of the first telescopes to directly capture light from exoplanets, namely the "hot Jupiters" HD 209458 b and TrES-1b, although it did not resolve that light into actual images. This was one of the first times the light from extrasolar planets had been directly detected; earlier observations had been indirectly made by drawing conclusions from behaviors of the stars the planets were orbiting. The telescope also discovered in April 2005 that Cohen-kuhi Tau/4 had a planetary disk that was vastly younger and contained less mass than previously theorized, leading to new understandings of how planets are formed.

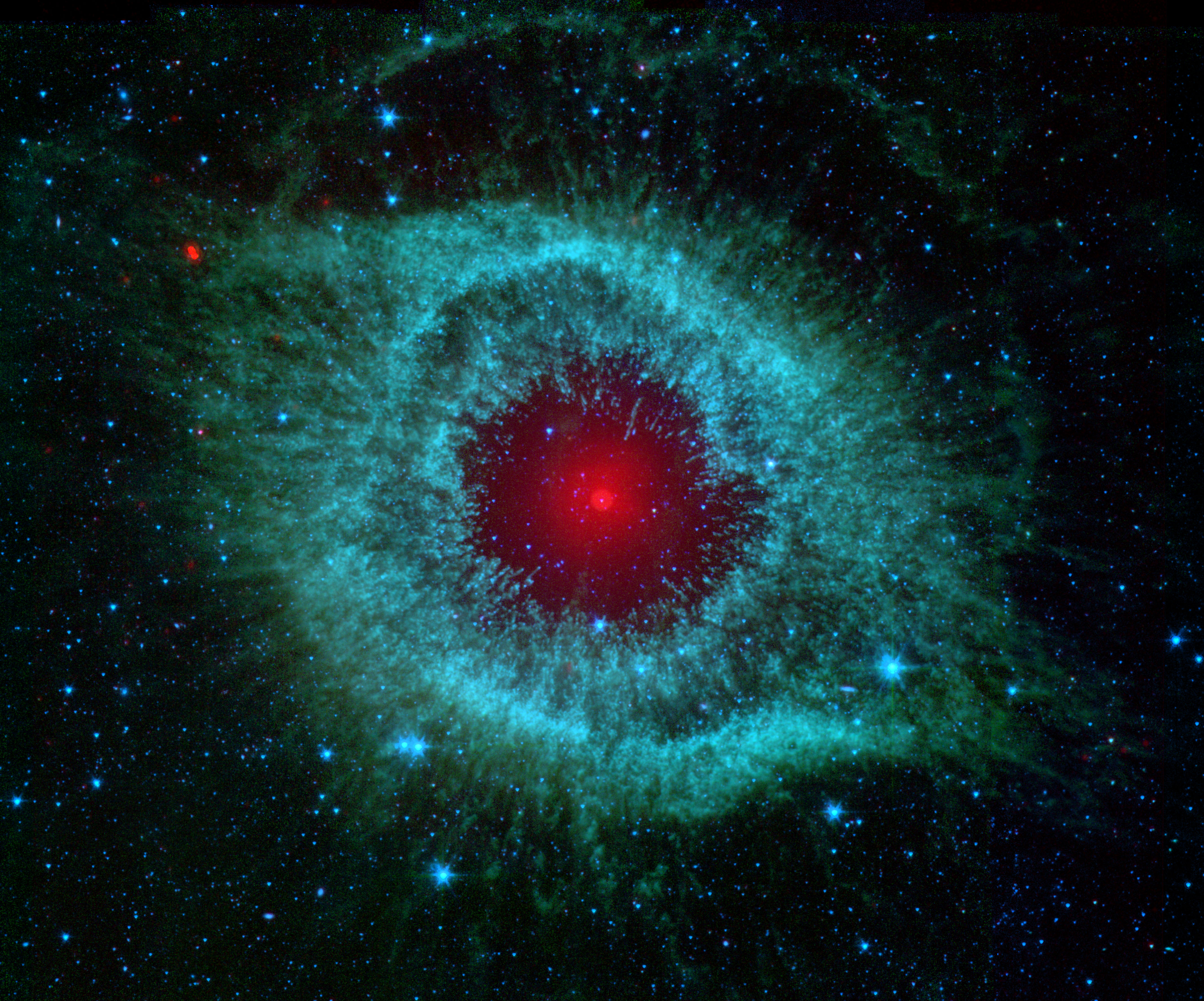
The Helix Nebula, blue shows infrared light of 3.6 to 4.5 micrometers, green shows infrared light of 5.8 to 8 micrometers, and red shows infrared light of 24 micrometers.

In 2004, it was reported that Spitzer had spotted a faintly glowing body that may be the youngest star ever seen. The telescope was trained on a core of gas and dust known as L1014 which had previously appeared completely dark to ground-based observatories and to ISO (Infrared Space Observatory), a predecessor to Spitzer. The advanced technology of Spitzer revealed a bright red hot spot in the middle of L1014.

Scientists from the University of Texas at Austin, who discovered the object, believe the hot spot to be an example of early star development, with the young star collecting gas and dust from the cloud around it. Early speculation about the hot spot was that it might have been the faint light of another core that lies 10 times further from Earth but along the same line of sight as L1014. Follow-up observations from ground-based near-infrared observatories detected a faint fan-shaped glow in the same location as the object found by Spitzer. That glow is too feeble to have come from the more distant core, leading to the conclusion that the object is located within L1014. (Young et al., 2004)

In 2005, astronomers from the University of Wisconsin at Madison and Whitewater determined, on the basis of 400 hours of observation on the Spitzer Space Telescope, that the Milky Way galaxy has a more substantial bar structure across its core than previously recognized.

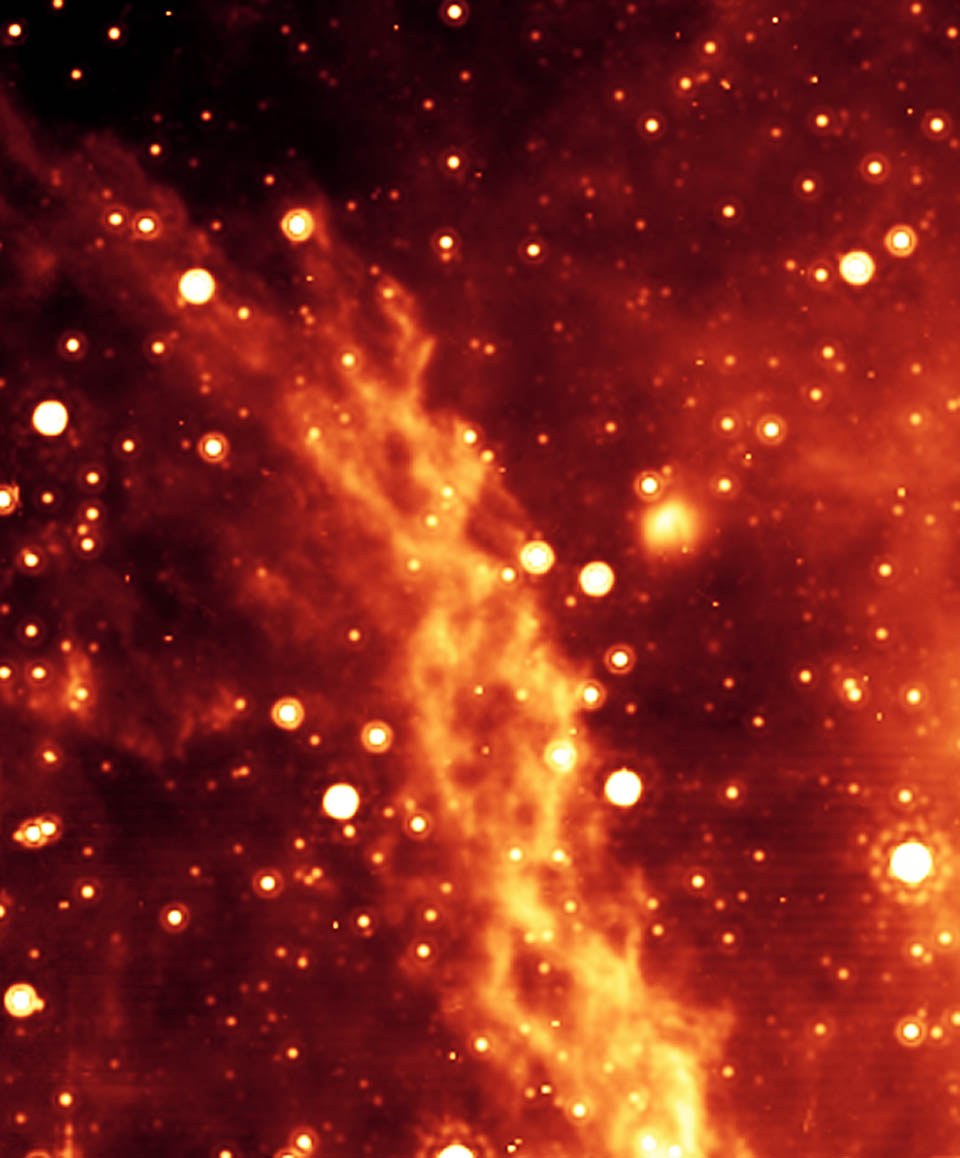
An artificial color image of the Double Helix Nebula, thought to be generated at the galactic center by magnetic torsion 1000 times greater than the Sun's.

Also in 2005, astronomers Alexander Kashlinsky and John Mather of NASA's Goddard Space Flight Center reported that one of Spitzer's earliest images may have captured the light of the first stars in the universe. An image of a quasar in the constellation Draco, intended only to help calibrate the telescope, was found to contain an infrared glow after the light of known objects was removed. Kashlinsky and Mather are convinced that the numerous blobs in this glow are the light of stars that formed as early as 100 million years after the Big Bang, redshifted by cosmic expansion.

In March 2006, astronomers reported an 80-light-year-long (25 pc) nebula near the center of the Milky Way Galaxy, the Double Helix Nebula, which is, as the name implies, twisted into a double spiral shape. This is thought to be evidence of massive magnetic fields generated by the gas disc orbiting the supermassive black hole at the galaxy's center, 300 light-years (92 pc) from the nebula and 25,000 light-years (7,700 pc) from Earth. This nebula was discovered by Spitzer and published in the magazine Nature on 16 March 2006.

In May 2007, astronomers successfully mapped the atmospheric temperature of HD 189733 b, thus obtaining the first map of some kind of an extrasolar planet.

Starting in September 2006, the telescope participated in a series of surveys called the Gould Belt Survey, observing the Gould's Belt region in multiple wavelengths. The first set of observations by the Spitzer Space Telescope was completed from 21 September 2006 through 27 September. Resulting from these observations, the team of astronomers led by Dr. Robert Gutermuth, of the Center for Astrophysics | Harvard & Smithsonian reported the discovery of Serpens South, a cluster of 50 young stars in the constellation Serpens.

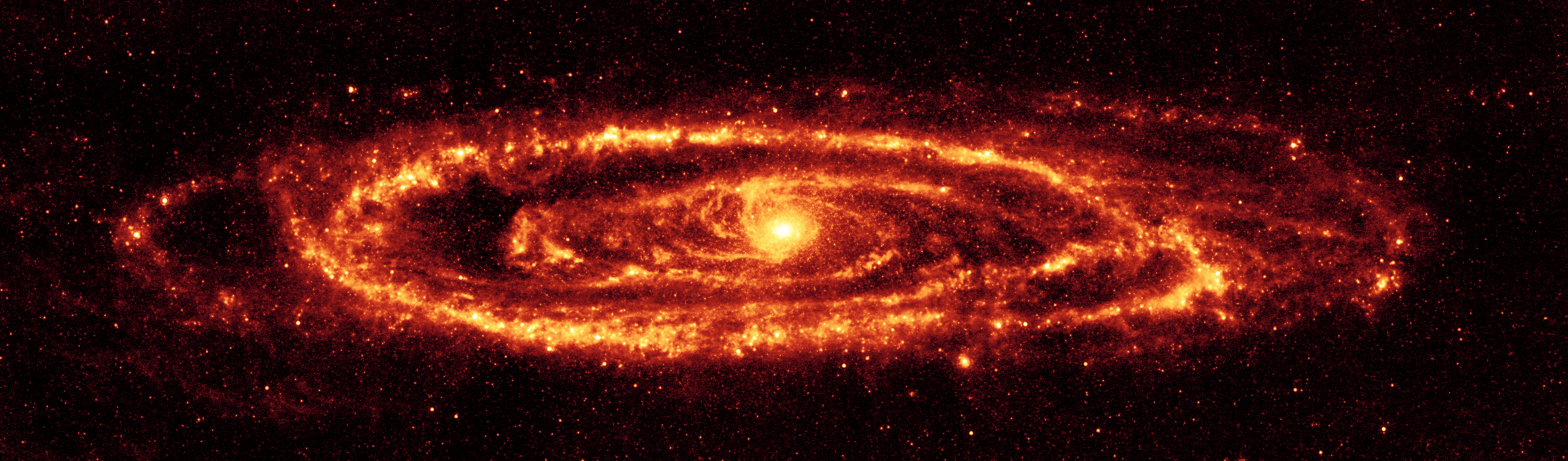
The Andromeda Galaxy imaged by MIPS at 24 micrometers.

Scientists have long wondered how tiny silicate crystals, which need high temperatures to form, have found their way into frozen comets, born in the very cold environment of the Solar System's outer edges. The crystals would have begun as non-crystallized, amorphous silicate particles, part of the mix of gas and dust from which the Solar System developed. This mystery has deepened with the results of the Stardust sample return mission, which captured particles from Comet Wild 2. Many of the Stardust particles were found to have formed at temperatures in excess of 1,000 K.

In May 2009, Spitzer researchers from Germany, Hungary, and the Netherlands found that amorphous silicate appears to have been transformed into crystalline form by an outburst from a star. They detected the infrared signature of forsterite silicate crystals on the disk of dust and gas surrounding the star EX Lupi during one of its frequent flare-ups, or outbursts, seen by Spitzer in April 2008. These crystals were not present in Spitzer's previous observations of the star's disk during one of its quiet periods. These crystals appear to have formed by radiative heating of the dust within 0.5 AU of EX Lupi.

In August 2009, the telescope found evidence of a high-speed collision between two burgeoning planets orbiting a young star.

In October 2009, astronomers Anne J. Verbiscer, Michael F. Skrutskie, and Douglas P. Hamilton published findings of the "Phoebe ring" of Saturn, which was found with the telescope; the ring is a huge, tenuous disc of material extending from 128 to 207 times the radius of Saturn.

=== GLIMPSE and MIPSGAL surveys ===
GLIMPSE, the Galactic Legacy Infrared Mid-Plane Survey Extraordinaire, was a series of surveys that spanned 360° of the inner region of the Milky Way galaxy, which provided the first large-scale mapping of the galaxy. It consists of more than 2 million snapshots taken in four separate wavelengths using the Infrared Array Camera. The images were taken over a 10-year period beginning in 2003 when Spitzer launched.

MIPSGAL, a similar survey that complements GLIMPSE, covers 248° of the galactic disk using the 24 and 70 μm channels of the MIPS instrument.

On 3 June 2008, scientists unveiled the largest, most detailed infrared portrait of the Milky Way, created by stitching together more than 800,000 snapshots, at the 212th meeting of the American Astronomical Society in St. Louis, Missouri. This composite survey is now viewable with the GLIMPSE/MIPSGAL Viewer.

=== 2010s ===
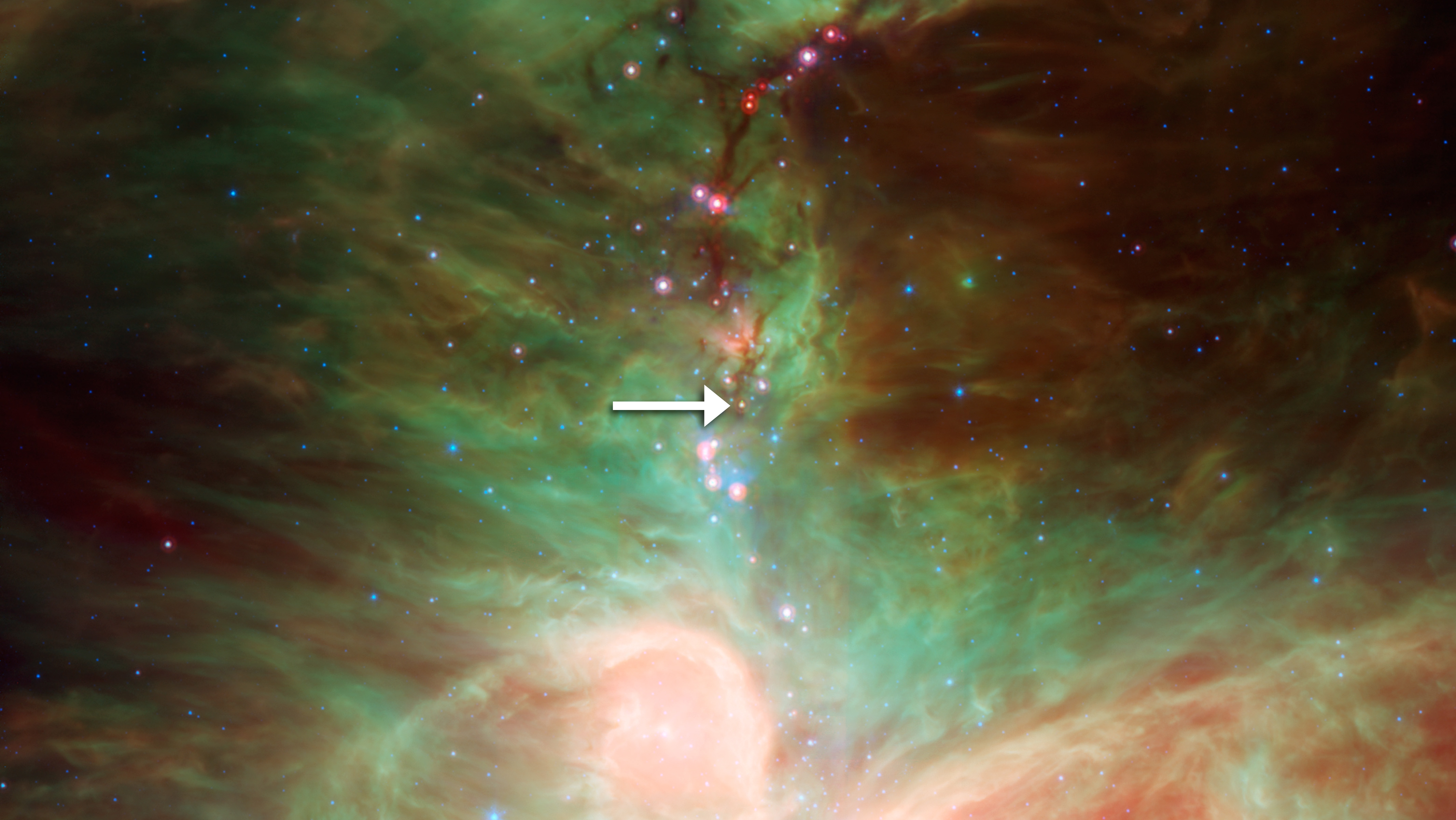
An arrow points to the embryonic star HOPS-68, where scientists believe forsterite crystals are raining down onto the central dust disk.

Spitzer observations, announced in May 2011, indicate that tiny forsterite crystals might be falling down like rain on to the protostar HOPS-68. The discovery of the forsterite crystals in the outer collapsing cloud of the protostar is surprising because the crystals form at lava-like high temperatures, yet they are found in the molecular cloud where the temperatures are about −170 °C (103 K; −274 °F). This led the team of astronomers to speculate that the bipolar outflow from the young star may be transporting the forsterite crystals from near the star's surface to the chilly outer cloud.

In January 2012, it was reported that further analysis of the Spitzer observations of EX Lupi can be understood if the forsterite crystalline dust was moving away from the protostar at a remarkable average speed of 38 kilometres per second (24 mi/s). It would appear that such high speeds can arise only if the dust grains had been ejected by a bipolar outflow close to the star. Such observations are consistent with an astrophysical theory, developed in the early 1990s, where it was suggested that bipolar outflows garden or transform the disks of gas and dust that surround protostars by continually ejecting reprocessed, highly heated material from the inner disk, adjacent to the protostar, to regions of the accretion disk further away from the protostar.

In April 2015, Spitzer and the Optical Gravitational Lensing Experiment were reported as co-discovering one of the most distant planets ever identified: a gas giant about 13,000 light-years (4,000 pc) away from Earth.

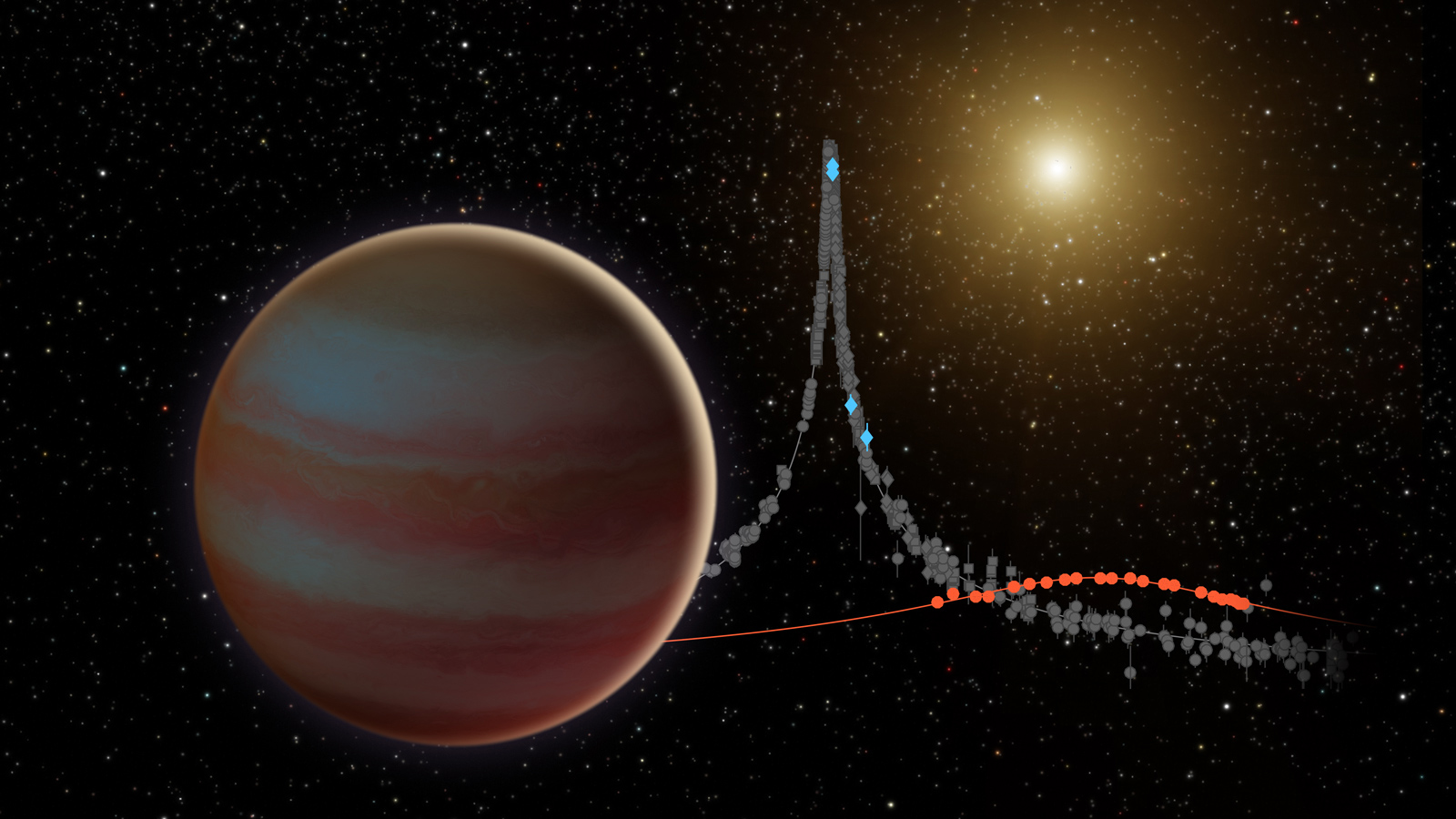
An illustration of a brown dwarf combined with a graph of light curves from OGLE-2015-BLG-1319: Ground-based data (grey), Swift (blue), and Spitzer (red).

In June and July 2015, the brown dwarf OGLE-2015-BLG-1319 was discovered using the gravitational microlensing detection method in a joint effort between Swift, Spitzer, and the ground-based Optical Gravitational Lensing Experiment, the first time two space telescopes have observed the same microlensing event. This method was possible because of the large separation between the two spacecraft: Swift is in low-Earth orbit while Spitzer is more than one AU distant in an Earth-trailing heliocentric orbit. This separation provided significantly different perspectives of the brown dwarf, allowing for constraints to be placed on some of the object's physical characteristics.

Reported in March 2016, Spitzer and Hubble were used to discover the most distant-known galaxy, GN-z11. This object was seen as it appeared 13.4 billion years ago.

=== Spitzer Beyond ===
On 1 October 2016, Spitzer began its Observation Cycle 13, a 2 1/2 year extended mission nicknamed Beyond. One of the goals of this extended mission was to help prepare for the James Webb Space Telescope, also an infrared telescope, by identifying candidates for more detailed observations.

Another aspect of the Beyond mission was the engineering challenges of operating Spitzer in its progressing orbital phase. As the spacecraft moved farther from Earth on the same orbital path from the Sun, its antenna had to point at increasingly higher angles to communicate with ground stations; this change in angle imparted more and more solar heating on the vehicle while its solar panels received less sunlight.

=== Planet hunter ===
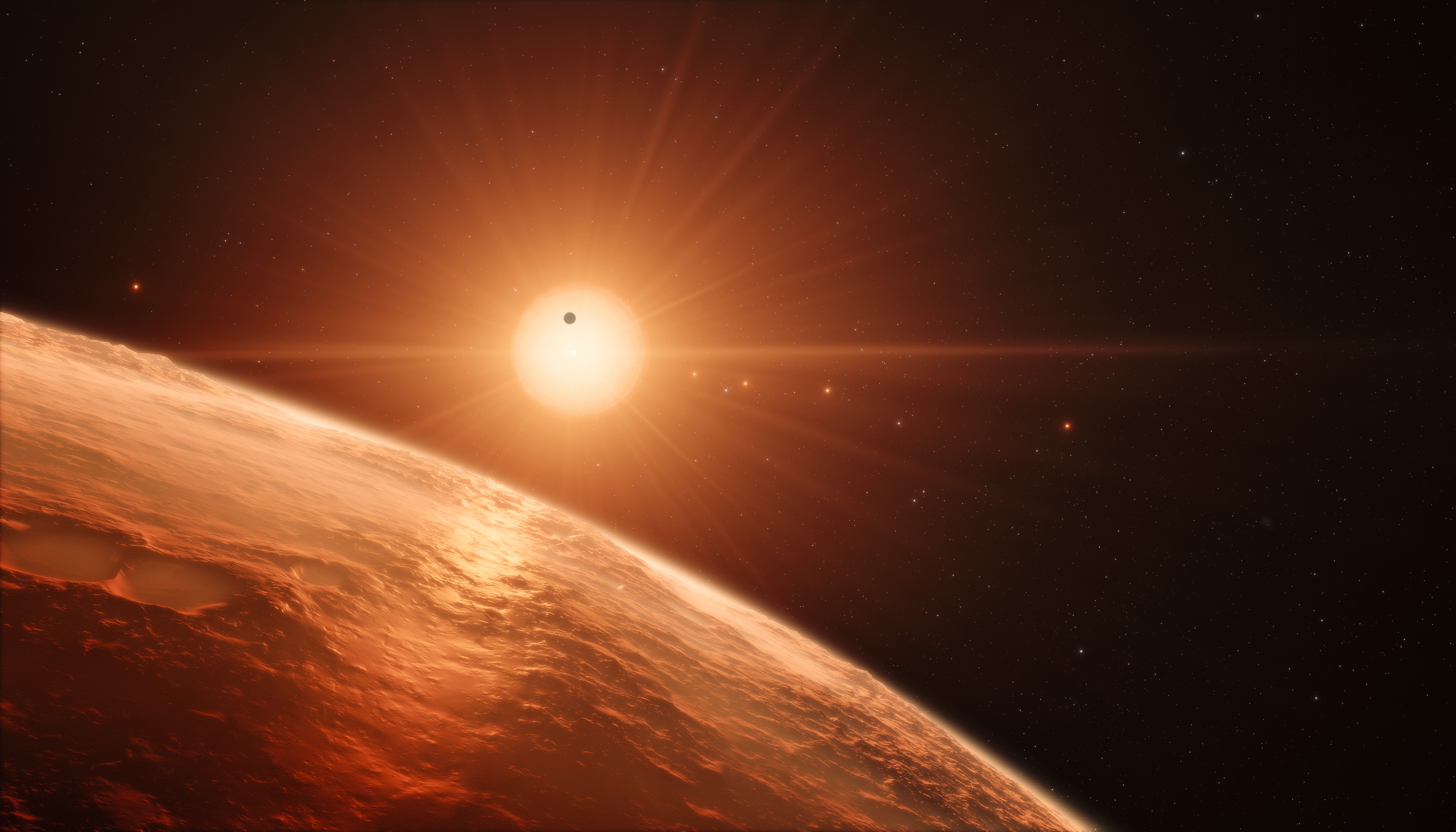
An artist's impression of the TRAPPIST-1 system.

Spitzer was also put to work studying exoplanets thanks to creatively tweaking its hardware. This included doubling its stability by modifying its heating cycle, finding a new use for the "peak-up" camera, and analyzing the sensor at a sub-pixel level. Although in its "warm" mission, the spacecraft's passive cooling system kept the sensors at 29 K (−244 °C; −407 °F). Spitzer used the transit photometry and gravitational microlensing techniques to perform these observations. According to NASA's Sean Carey, "We never even considered using Spitzer for studying exoplanets when it launched. ... It would have seemed ludicrous back then, but now it's an important part of what Spitzer does."

Examples of exoplanets discovered using Spitzer include HD 219134 b in 2015, which was shown to be a rocky planet about 1.5 times as large as Earth in a three-day orbit around its star; and an unnamed planet found using microlensing located about 13,000 light-years (4,000 pc) from Earth.

In September–October 2016, Spitzer was used to discover five of a total of seven known planets around the star TRAPPIST-1, all of which are approximately Earth-sized and likely rocky. Three of the discovered planets are located in the habitable zone, which means they are capable of supporting liquid water given sufficient parameters. Using the transit method, Spitzer helped measure the sizes of the seven planets and estimate the mass and density of the inner six. Further observations will help determine if there is liquid water on any of the planets.

== See also ==
- Herschel Space Observatory (2009–2013)
- Infrared astronomy
- List of deep fields
- List of space telescopes
- List of largest infrared telescopes
