= Double Helix Nebula =

Nebula in the constellation Ophiucius

Emission nebula
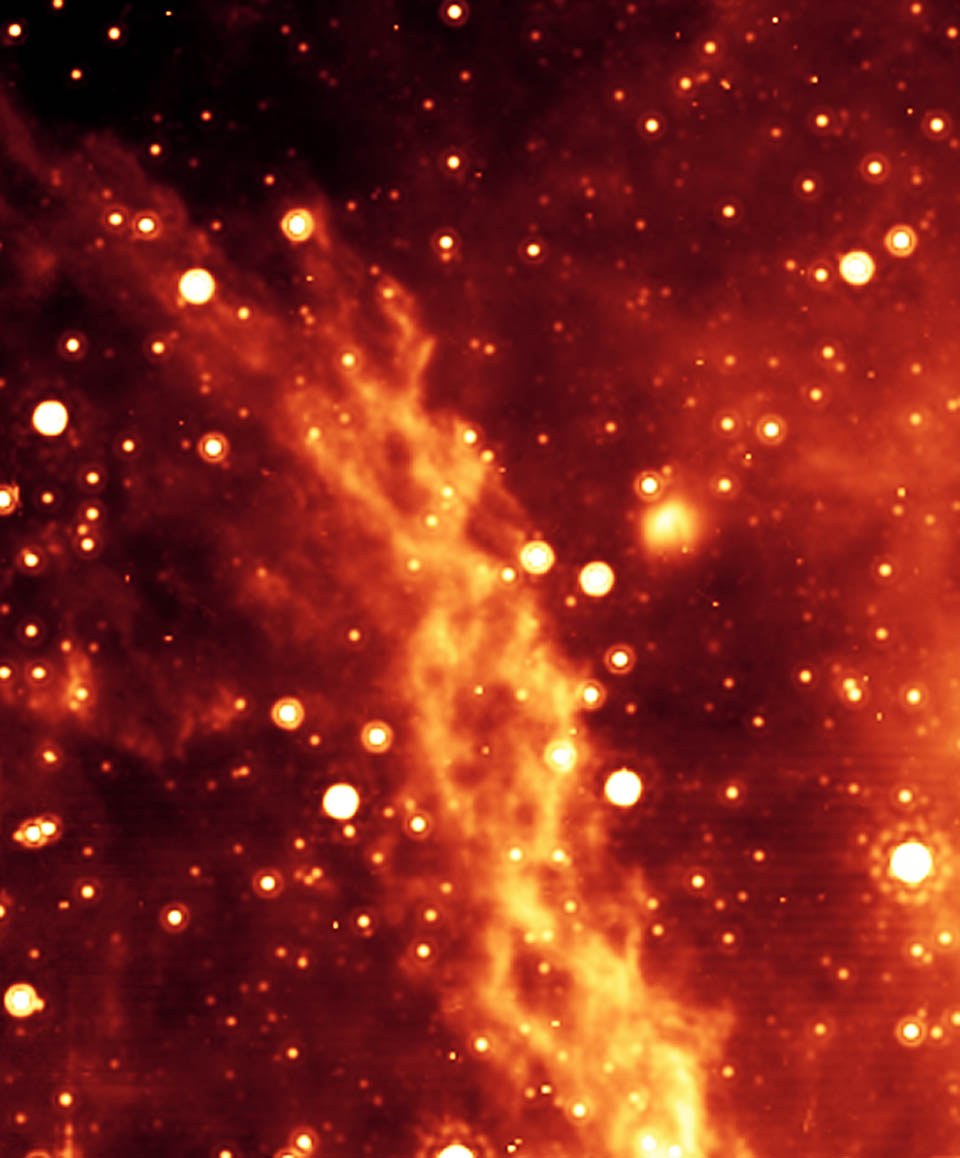
- Spitzer Space Telescope image with artificial coloration

Observation data
- Constellation: Ophiuchus

The Double Helix Nebula is a gaseous nebula in the direction of the constellation Ophiuchus, near the center of our galaxy. It is thought to have been distorted by magnetic torsion into the shape of two connected spirals, known as a double helix, which is akin to the shape of a DNA molecule.

There are infrared-luminous stars contained in the nebula that are red-giants and other supergiant stars. There are other stars contained within, but are mostly too dim to be observed.

The nebula was discovered by the Spitzer Space Telescope. The segment seen so far is thought to be 80 light years long, 300 light years from the supermassive black hole thought to be at the galaxy's center, and 25,000 light years from Earth.

This nebula is seen as circumstantial evidence that the magnetic fields at the center of the galaxy are extremely strong, more than 1,000 times stronger than those of the Sun. If so, they may be driven by the massive disc of gas orbiting the central super-massive black hole.
