= Infrared Science Archive =

Primary archive for the infrared and submillimeter astronomical projects of NASA

The Infrared Science Archive (IRSA) is the primary archive for the infrared and submillimeter astronomical projects of NASA, the space agency of the United States. IRSA curates the science products of over 15 missions, including the Spitzer Space Telescope, the Wide-field Infrared Survey Explorer (WISE), the Infrared Astronomical Satellite (IRAS), and the Two Micron All-Sky Survey (2MASS). It also serves data from infrared and submillimeter European Space Agency missions with NASA participation, including the Infrared Space Observatory (ISO), Planck, and the Herschel Space Observatory. As of 2019, IRSA provides access to more than 1 petabyte of data consisting of roughly 1 trillion astronomical measurements, which span wavelengths from 1 micron to 10 millimeters and include all-sky coverage in 24 bands. Approximately 10% of all refereed astronomical journal articles cite data sets curated by IRSA.

IRSA is part of the Infrared Processing and Analysis Center (IPAC) and is located on the campus of the California Institute of Technology. It is one of NASA's Astrophysics Data Centers, along with the High Energy Astrophysics Science Archive Research Center (HEASARC), the Mikulski Archive for Space Telescopes (MAST), and others.
