= CoKu Tau/4 =

Star in the constellation Taurus

Observation data Epoch J2000 Equinox J2000
- Constellation: Taurus
- Right ascension: 04^{h} 41^{m} 16.810^{s}
- Declination: +28° 40′ 00.07″
- Apparent magnitude (V): 14.68

Characteristics
- Spectral type: M1.5e

Astrometry
Proper motion (μ)	RA: +4.317 mas/yr Dec.: −22.201 mas/yr
Parallax (π)	6.4456±0.1146 mas
Distance	506 ± 9 ly (155 ± 3 pc)

Other designations
- CoKu Tauri/4, CoKu Tau-Aur Star 4, HBC 421, 2MASS J04411681+2840000

Database references
SIMBAD	data

CoKu Tau/4 is a pre-main-sequence binary T Tauri star system in the constellation Taurus. The stars are surrounded by a circumbinary disc with a central cavity of radius 10 astronomical units. Before its binary nature was known, the central cavity in the system's disc was thought to have been cleared out by a planet of at least 10 Jupiter masses, a rare example of a so-called "transitional disc". This model was disproven in 2008 when the star was resolved using adaptive optics as a system of two near-equal-mass stars with a projected separation of 8 AU. The central cavity is thus cleared out by the stars, not by the gravitational influence of a planet.
