= 3MM-1 =

Star-forming galaxy in the constellation Sextans

Observation data (J2000 epoch)
- Constellation: Sextans
- Right ascension: 10^{h} 02^{m} 36.82^{s}
- Declination: +02° 08′ 40.60″
- Redshift: 5.5+1.2 −1.1
- Distance: 12.5×10^{9} light years

Characteristics
- Mass: 10^{10.8} M_{☉}

Other designations
- [WLS2019] 3MM-1

3MM-1 (also known as COS-3mm-1) is a star-forming galaxy about 12.5 billion light-years away that is obscured by clouds of dust. It is located in the constellation of Sextans. It was first detected in spectroscopic data on rotational transitions of carbon monoxide obtained using the Atacama Large Millimeter Array from 23 to 24 December 2018, as detailed in an article that was published on 22 October 2019. The authors of this article described the discovery as "serendipitous", since the focus of their planned observations had been on galaxies at redshifts near 1.5 that are quiescent — i.e. do not form stars — and directly observable, yet 3MM-1 was found at a redshift of about 5.5, is forming stars and not directly observable. In the same dataset, another dust-obscured star-forming galaxy, 3MM-2, was found at a redshift of about 3.3.

In early 2021, a more precise estimate of 3MM-1's redshift was published, according to which the value is z = 5.857 ± 0.001.

3MM-1 has a mass of about 10^{10.8} solar masses, and stars form in it at about 100 times the rate as in the Milky Way.
