= L1014 =

Dark nebula in the constellation Cygnus

Dark nebula
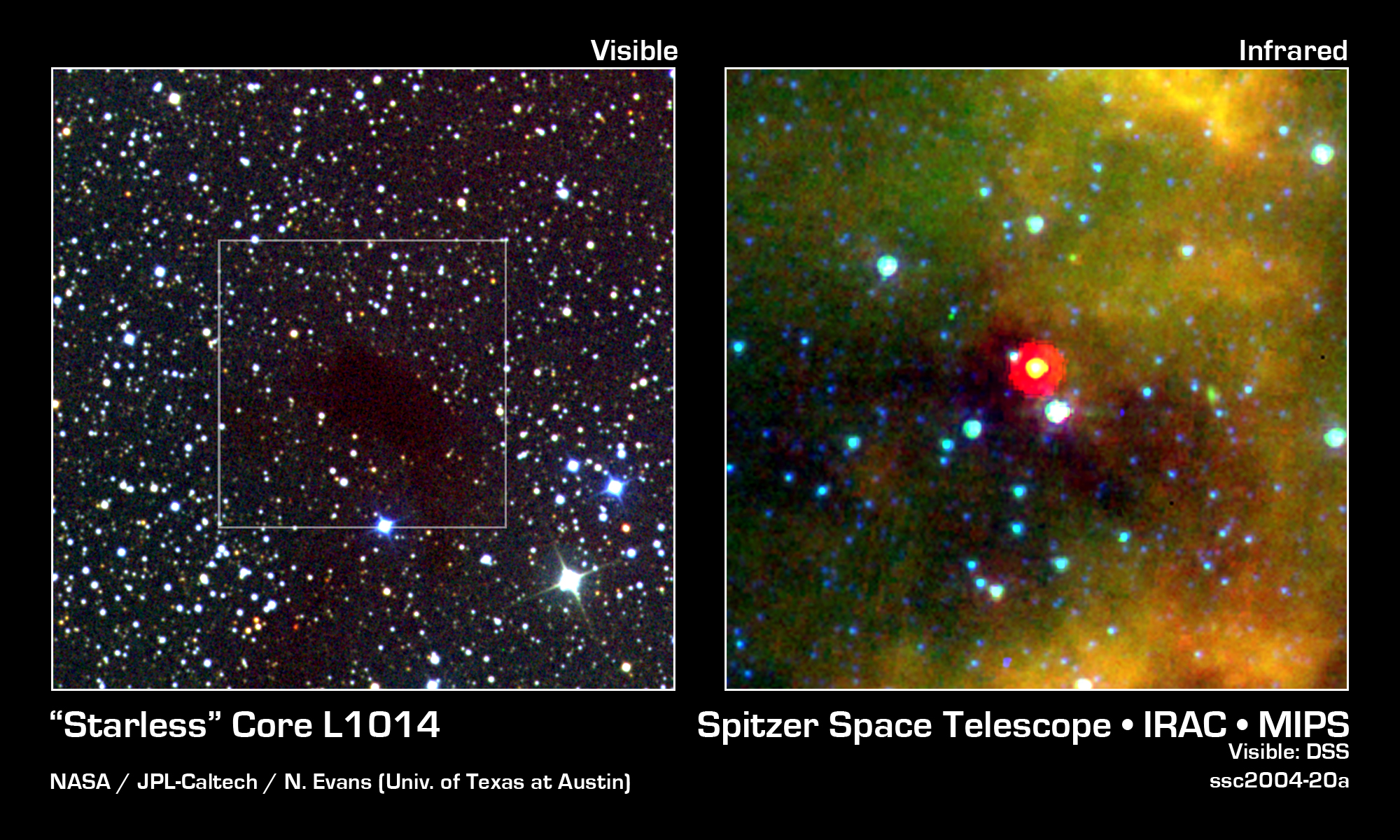

Observation data: J2000 epoch
- Subtype: Dense core
- Class: Lynds opacity class 6
- Right ascension: 21^{h} 24^{m} 06^{s}
- Declination: +49° 59′ 07″
- Distance: 200 pc
- Apparent diameter: ~2′
- Constellation: Cygnus
- Designations: LDN 1014.

L1014 is a dark nebula in the constellation Cygnus. It may be among the most centrally condensed small dark clouds known, perhaps indicative of the earliest stages of star formation processes. This cloud harbors at its core a very young low-mass star named L1014 IRS; some astronomers have suggested that this object may be a brown dwarf or even a rogue planet at the earliest stage of its lifetime.
