= LkCa 15 =

Star system in the constellation Taurus

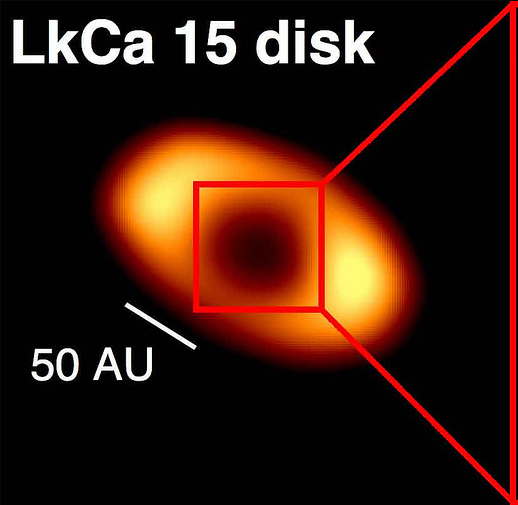
- LkCa 15 protoplanetary disk

Observation data Epoch J2000.0 Equinox ICRS
- Constellation: Taurus
- Right ascension: 04^{h} 39^{m} 17.796^{s}
- Declination: +22° 21′ 03.48″
- Apparent magnitude (V): +11.91

Characteristics
- Spectral type: K5V
- Variable type: T Tauri

Astrometry
Proper motion (μ)	RA: 10.572 mas/yr Dec.: -17.527 mas/yr
Parallax (π)	6.3619±0.0264 mas
Distance	513 ± 2 ly (157.2 ± 0.7 pc)

Details
Mass	0.97 ± 0.03 M_{☉}
Radius	1.2 R_{☉}
Luminosity	1.22 L_{☉}
Temperature	4730 K
Age	2 Myr

Other designations
- V1079 Tau, GSC 01278-00193, TYC 1278-193-1, 2MASS J04391779+2221034

Database references
SIMBAD	data

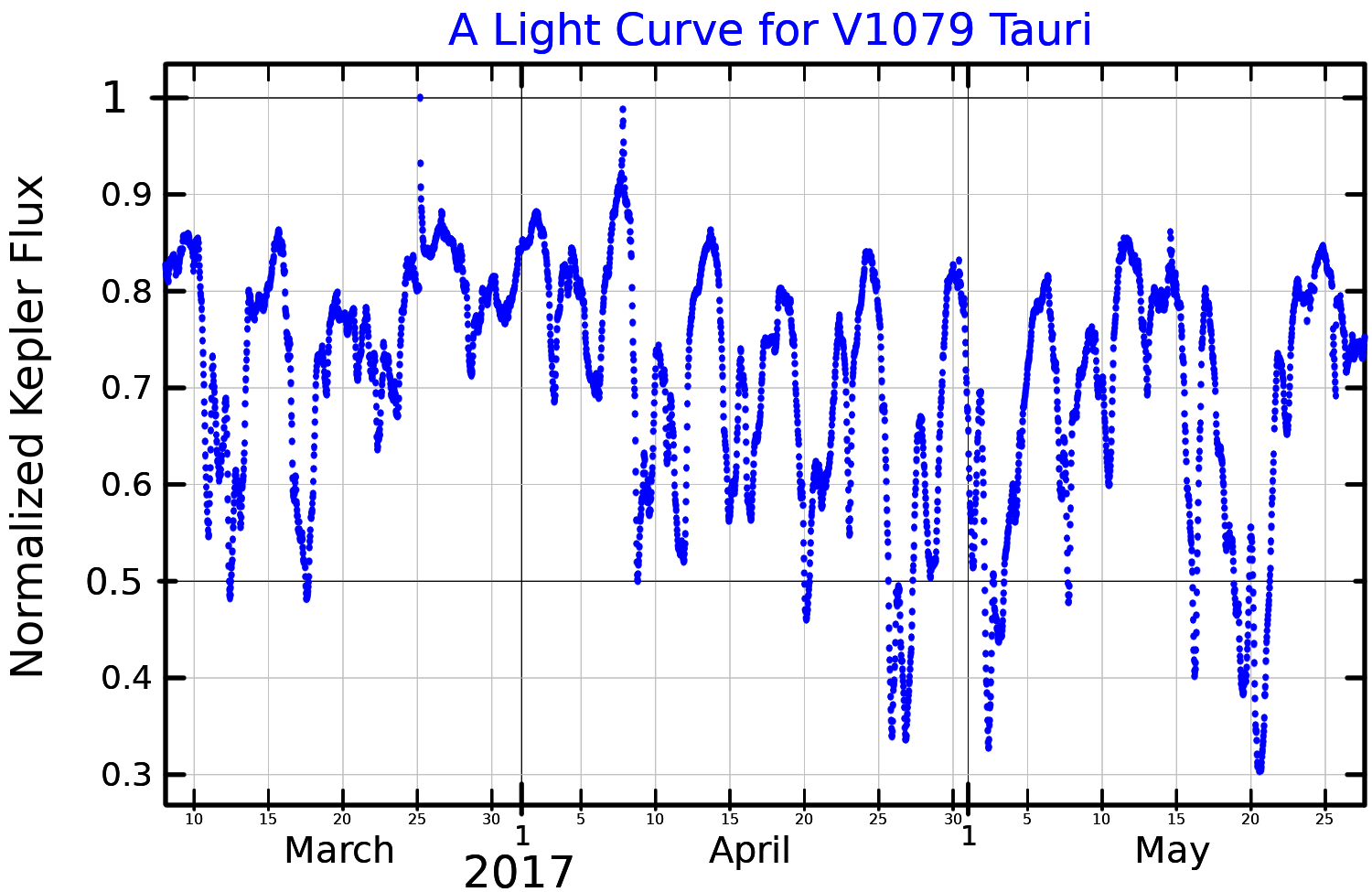
A light curve for V1079 Tauri, adapted from Alencar et al. (2018)

LkCa 15 is a T Tauri star in the Taurus Molecular Cloud. These types of stars are relatively young pre-main-sequence stars that show irregular variations in brightness. It has a mass that is about 97% of the Sun, an effective temperature of 4370 K, and is slightly cooler than the Sun. Its apparent magnitude is 11.91, meaning it is not visible to the naked eye. Its name stems from an older survey.

In 1993, Jérôme Bouvier et al. announced that LkCa 15 is a variable star. It was given its variable star designation, V1079 Tauri, in 1995.

== Planetary system ==
LkCa 15 is surrounded by a protoplanetary disk, typical of many T Tauri stars. The disk around the star is about 55 times more massive than Jupiter, and consists of three major belts (components). Small changes in the observed brightness of the disk may be due to a planetary companion; the star was believed to have a protoplanetary object or exoplanet orbiting it, known as LkCa 15 b. Later, the existence of up to three planets was suspected. The planets' existence was refuted in 2019 as higher resolution imaging became available.

The LkCa 15 planetary system
Companion (in order from star)	Mass	Semimajor axis (AU)	Orbital period (days)	Eccentricity	Inclination (°)	Radius
Protoplanetary disk component 1	0.12–3 AU				50°	—
Protoplanetary disk component 2	20–40 AU				51.5°	—
Protoplanetary disk component 3	55–160 AU				50°	—
