= SU Aurigae =

Star in the constellation Auriga

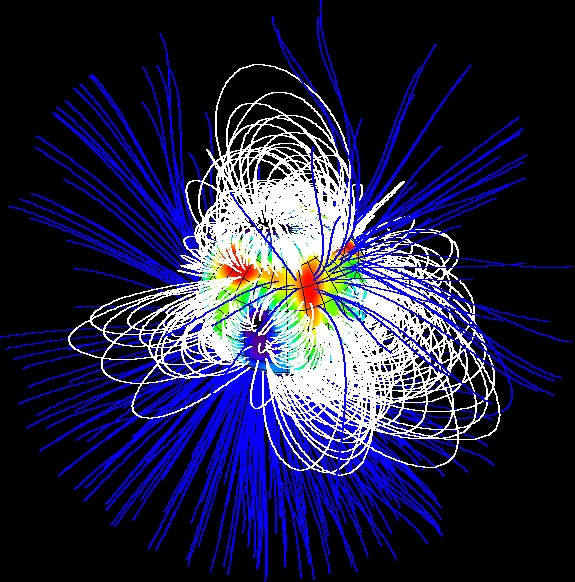
- Diagram of SU Aurigae's magnetic field

Observation data Epoch J2000 Equinox ICRS
- Constellation: Auriga
- Right ascension: 04^{h} 55^{m} 59.38669^{s}
- Declination: +30° 34′ 01.4996″
- Apparent magnitude (V): 9.30

Characteristics
- Spectral type: G2IIIne
- Apparent magnitude (G): 9.25
- B−V color index: +0.74
- Variable type: T Tauri

Astrometry
Radial velocity (R_{v})	8.31±2.71 km/s
Proper motion (μ)	RA: 4.185±0.031 mas/yr Dec.: −24.304±0.022 mas/yr
Parallax (π)	6.3700±0.0303 mas
Distance	512 ± 2 ly (157.0 ± 0.7 pc)
Absolute magnitude (M_{V})	+2.83

Details
Mass	2.22+0.02 −0.05 M_{☉}
Radius	2.61+0.20 −0.23 R_{☉}
Luminosity	12.9±0.3 L_{☉}
Surface gravity (log g)	3.65±0.01 cgs
Temperature	5680+40 −20 K
Metallicity [Fe/H]	+0.48±0.06 dex
Rotation	2.68+0.15 −0.14 days
Rotational velocity (v sin i)	58±3 km/s
Age	2.92+0.19 −0.41 Myr

Other designations
- SU Aur, BD+30° 743, HD 282624, HIP 22925, SAO 57509, Gaia DR3 157010573981545344

Database references
SIMBAD	data

SU Aurigae is a T Tauri-type variable star in the constellation Auriga. It is located about 500 light-years (150 parsecs) away in the Taurus-Auriga Star Forming Region. Its apparent magnitude is 9.30, which is dim enough that it cannot be seen with the unaided eye.

In 1907, Henrietta Swan Leavitt discovered that SU Aurigae is a variable star.

SU Aurigae's spectral type of G2IIIne means that it is a G-type star with an effective temperature similar to the Sun. The III in the spectral type refers to its luminosity, which is much higher than normal G-type main sequence stars and would put it in the giant star class. However, it is only about 4 million years old, which is relatively young for a star - young protostars like SU Aurigae are luminous because they are larger, not condensing into a normal size until they are older.

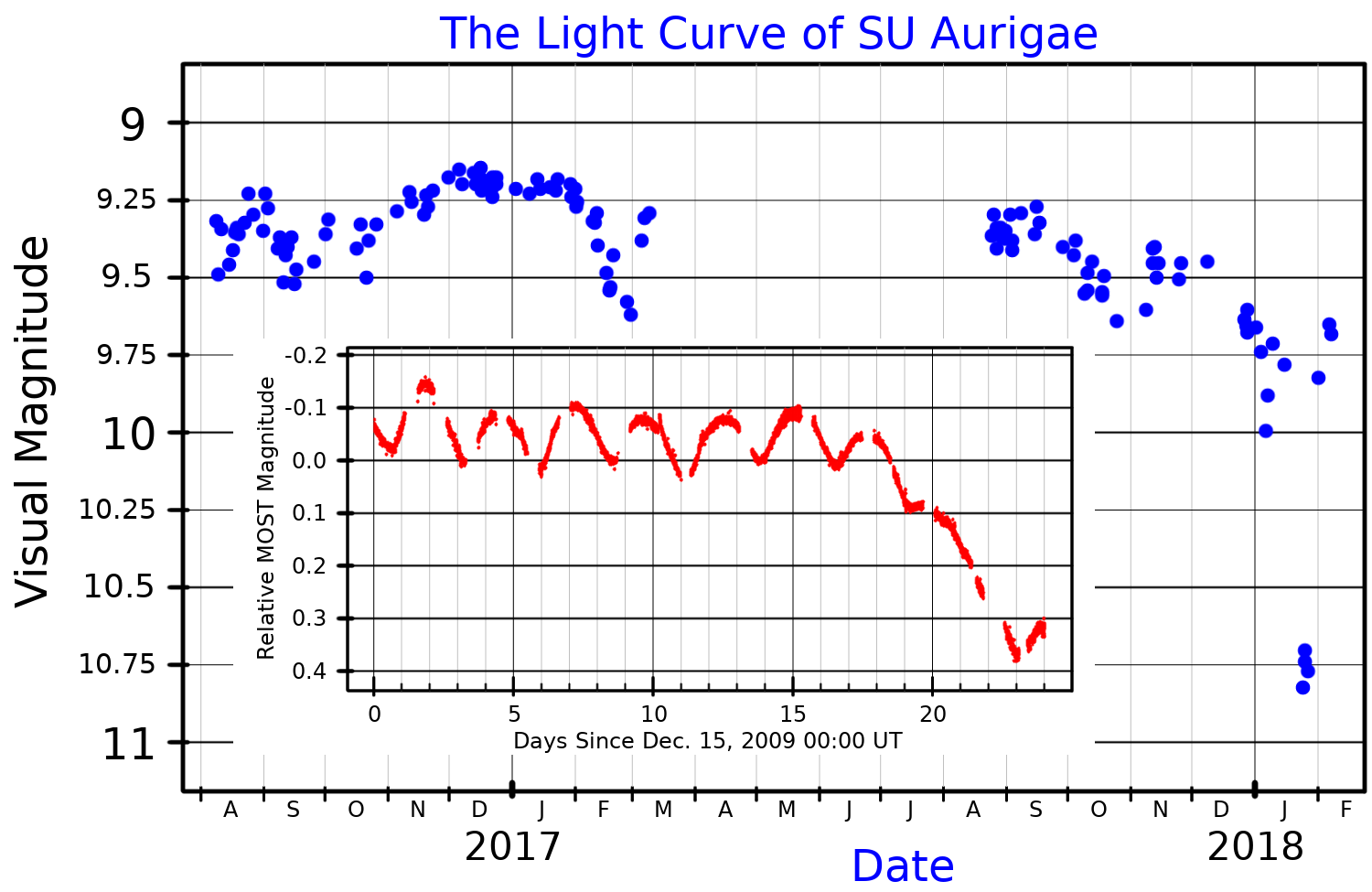
Light curves for SU Aurigae. The main plot shows the long term variability, and the inset plot shows the short term variability measured by the MOST spacecraft. Adapted from Grankin et al. (2018) and Cody et al. (2013)

SU Aurigae is known to have a circumstellar protoplanetary disk surrounding it, which is typical of many T Tauri stars. SU Aurigae's disk has a high inclination of 62° and is nearly perpendicular to the plane of sky, so orbiting protoplanets or comets may be the cause of why there are drops in the amount of light detected. SU Aurigae's proper motion and distance is similar to AB Aurigae, a better known pre-main-sequence star, meaning that the two may form a very wide binary system; if not, they are still in the same star association.
