= Taurus molecular cloud =

Interstellar molecular cloud in the constellations Taurus and Auriga

Molecular cloud
- Giant molecular cloud
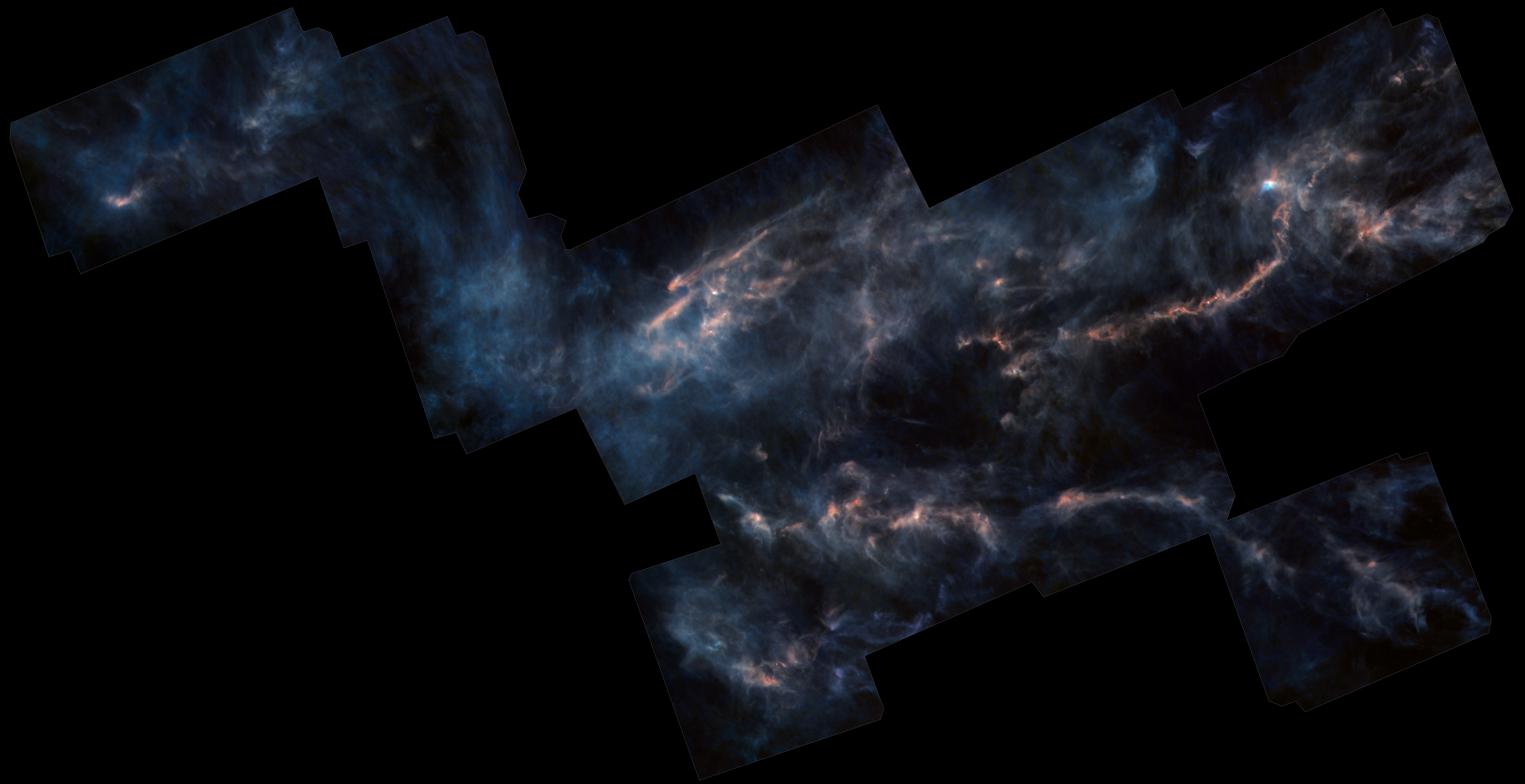
- Taurus molecular cloud (Herschel Space Observatory)

Observation data: J2000.0 epoch
- Right ascension: 04^{h} 41.0^{m}
- Declination: +25° 52′
- Distance: 430 ly (140 pc)
- Constellation: Taurus
- Notable features: Close distance, numerous molecular species
- Designations: HCL 2, Heiles's cloud 2, TMC-1, Taurus molecular cloud 1

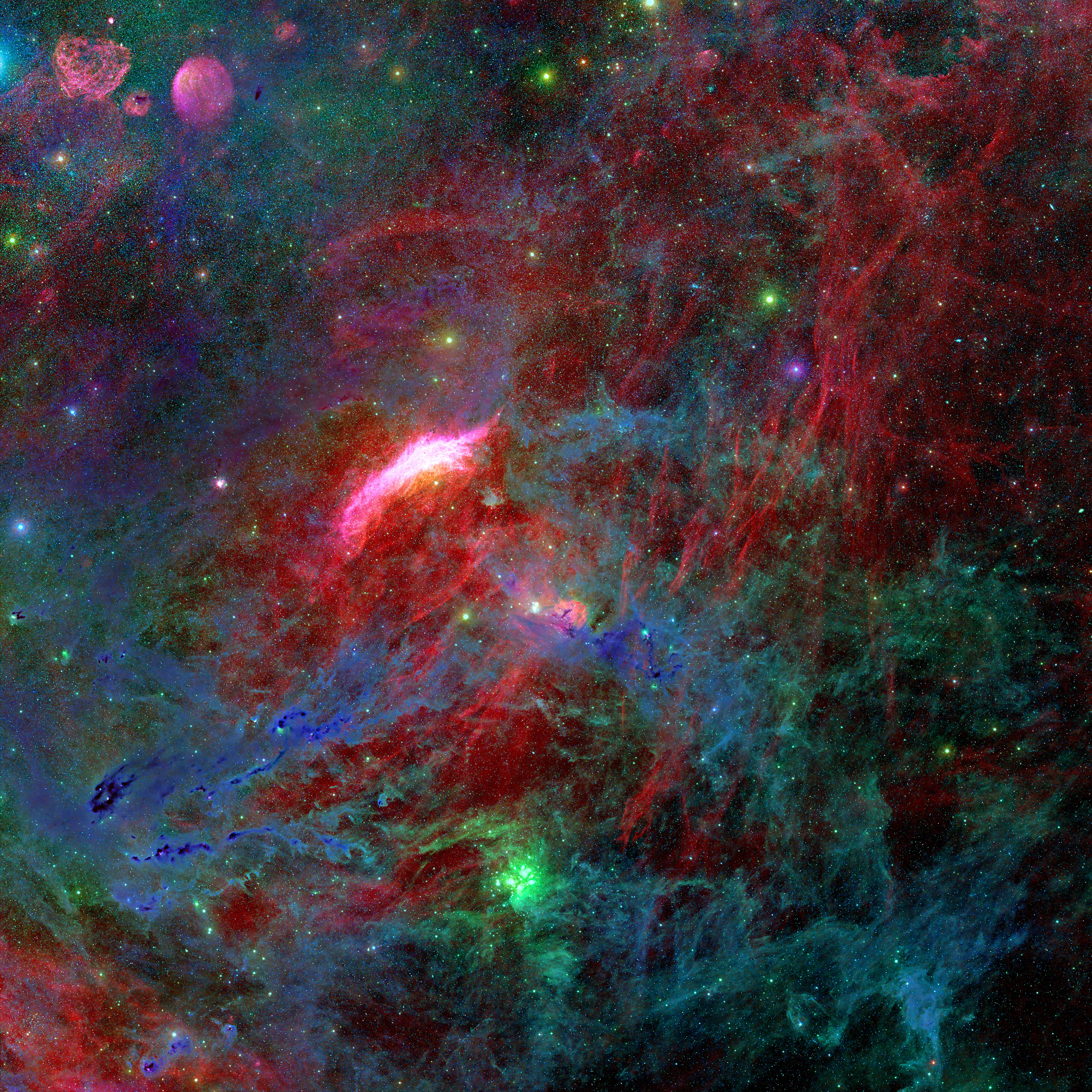
Taurus molecular cloud (green and blue) in front of HII regions (red) as seen by the Northern Sky Narrowband Survey. The Pleiades (bright green nebulae on the right side) appear to be connected in this image. Indeed, they lie at the same distance, making it likely that this object is related.

This video begins with a wide-field view of the sky, before zooming into the Taurus molecular cloud region, about 450 light-years from Earth. Dark clouds of cosmic dust grains obscure the background stars at visible wavelengths. The submillimetre-wavelength observations from the LABOCA camera on APEX reveal the heat glow of the dust grains, shown here in orange tones. The observations cover two regions in the cloud, which are known as Barnard 211 and Barnard 213. In them, newborn stars are hidden, and dense clouds of gas are on the verge of collapsing to form yet more stars.

This video pans over part of the Taurus molecular cloud region.

The Taurus molecular cloud (TMC-1) is an interstellar molecular cloud in the constellations Taurus and Auriga. It is only 140 pc (430 ly) away from Earth, making it possibly the nearest large star formation region. It hosts a stellar nursery containing hundreds of newly formed stars. The Taurus molecular cloud was identified in the past as a part of the Gould Belt, a large structure surrounding the Solar System. More recently (January 2020) the Taurus molecular cloud was identified as being part of the much larger Radcliffe wave, a wave-shaped structure in the local arm of the Milky Way.

It has been important in star formation studies at all wavelengths of Electromagnetic spectrum. The many young stars and the close proximity to Earth make it uniquely well-suited to search for protoplanetary disks and exoplanets around stars, and to identify brown dwarfs in the association. Members of this region are suited for direct imaging of young exoplanets, which glow brightly in infrared wavelengths.

== Composition ==
The Taurus molecular clouds are notable because they contain many complex molecules, some of which are organic, and so far there have been over 100 different molecules including 75 main isotopic species, 20 carbon-13 substituted species, and seven deuterium-substituted species. The number of molecular species discovered make it the most prolific source of interstellar molecular discoveries. There is a stark contrast of the populations of molecules between TMC-1 and protoplanetary disks around protostars. TMC-1 has many unsaturated hydrocarbons while the disk of protostars have oxygen-rich organics found in sublimated ices.

Molecular that have been discovered in the Taurus molecular cloud includes Cyanopolyynes (HC_{n}N for n = 3,5,7,9), cumulene carbenes (H_{2}C_{n} for n = 3–6), N-Chlorosuccinimide (NCS), Thioketenes (H_{2}CCCS), Thioacetaldehyde (CH_{3}CHS), Tricarbon monosulfide (HC_{3}S^{+}), Vinylacetylene (CH_{2}CHCCH), allenyl acetylene, Propionitrile (CH_{3}CH_{2}CN) ethynyl cyclopropenylidene (1,2), cyclopentadiene and indene. The QUIJOTE survey have discovered several molecules such as cyanoacenaphthylene (3, 4), ortho-benzyne (o-C_{6}H_{4}) and fulvenallene. In 2007 the polyatomic anion octatetraynyl radical was detected in TMC-1, making it the second type of anion to be found in the interstellar medium and the largest such molecule detected to date. 1-Butyne (CH_{3}CH_{2}CCH) was tentatively discovered.

== Content ==
The stars in the Taurus molecular cloud are newly formed having an age of only 1–2 million years. The Taurus–Auriga association, which is the stellar association of the cloud, contains the variable star T Tauri, which is the prototype of T Tauri stars. HH 30 is a protoplanetary disk seen edge-on located in TMC-1. Based on distance estimates of HP Tau G2, the right side of the cloud is a farther edge of the nebula.

Below is a list of members of the Taurus–Auriga association with a circumstellar disk or exoplanet:

- HL Tauri – directly imaged disk with impressive details
- SU Aurigae – circumstellar disk
- AB Aurigae – circumstellar disk and hints of an exoplanet
- CI Tauri – directly imaged circumstellar disk, one confirmed exoplanet and hints of additional exoplanets
- V830 Tauri – circumstellar disk and one exoplanet V830 Tauri b
- LkCa 15 – directly imaged circumstellar disk and one possible directly imaged exoplanet LkCa 15 b
- GG Tauri – circumstellar disk
- UX Tauri – circumstellar disk
- 2MASS J04202144+2813491 – directly imaged disk, jets and disk wind
- DH Tauri – exoplanet DH Tauri b
- DG Tauri B – circumstellar disk associated with jets
- 2M0437b – directly imaged exoplanet
- V1298 Tauri – four confirmed transiting exoplanets
- 2MASS J04442713+2512164 brown dwarf with a resolved disk and a planet candidate

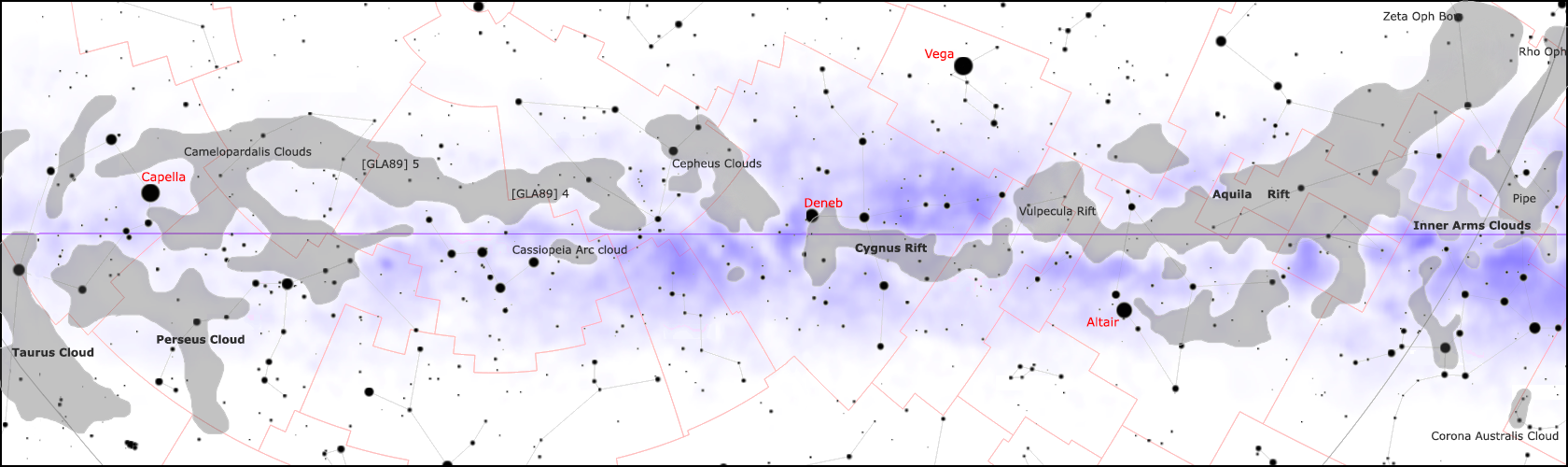
Main dark nebulae of the Solar apex half of the galactic plane, with the Taurus molecular cloud at the left edge.

== See also ==
- Taurus-Auriga association
- Orion molecular cloud complex
- Rho Ophiuchi cloud complex
- Perseus molecular cloud
- Cygnus X
- List of nearby stellar associations and moving groups
