= Radcliffe wave =

Coherent, wave-shaped gaseous structure in the Milky Way

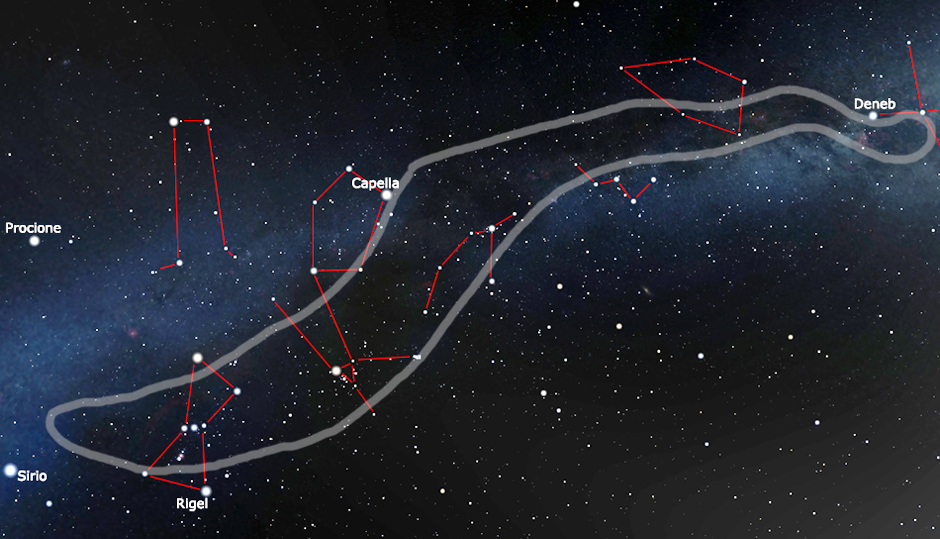
The approximate outline of the Radcliffe wave in Earth's night sky

The Radcliffe wave is a neighbouring coherent gaseous structure in the Milky Way, dotted with a related high concentration of interconnected stellar nurseries. It stretches about 8,800 light years. This structure runs with the trajectory of the Milky Way arms.

It lies at its closest (the Taurus Molecular Cloud) at around 400 light-years and at its farthest about 5,000 light-years (the Cygnus X star complex) from the Sun, always within the Local Arm (Orion Arm) itself, spanning about 40% of its length and on average 20% of its width. Its discovery was announced in January 2020, and its proximity surprised astronomers.

== Formation ==
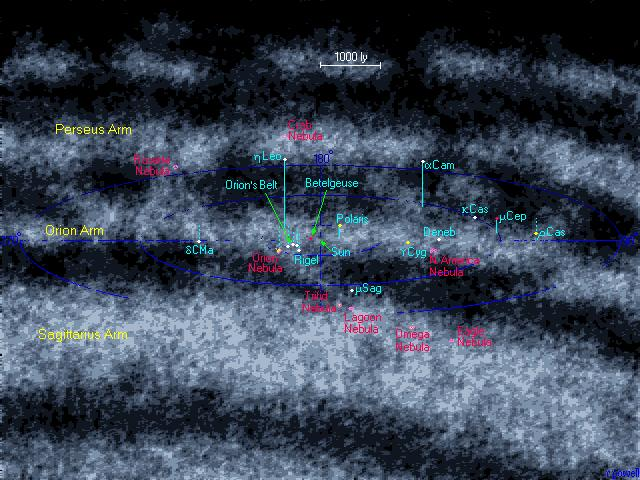
A clickable map of the nearby circa one-sixth outer sector of the galaxy, thus clearly showing the Local Arm (Orion Arm) and neighboring arms - as well as the Great Orion Nebula (as a very luminous feature of the less bright Orion molecular cloud complex) and broad-clouds North America Nebula (and Pelican Nebula) which is an intrinsic part of the Radcliffe wave.

Scientists do not know how the undulation of dust and gas formed. It has been suggested that it could be a result of a much smaller galaxy colliding with the Milky Way, leaving behind "ripples", or could be related to dark matter. Inside the dense clouds, gas can be so compressed that new stars are born. It has been suggested that this may be where the Sun originated.

Many of the star-forming regions found in the Radcliffe wave were thought to be part of a similar-sized but somewhat helio-centric ring which contained the Solar System, the "Gould Belt". It is now understood the nearest discrete relative concentration of sparse interstellar matter instead forms a massive wave.

== Discovery ==
The wave was discovered by an international team of astronomers including Catherine Zucker and João Alves. It was announced by co-author Alyssa A. Goodman at the 235th meeting of the American Astronomical Society, held at Honolulu and published in the journal Nature on 7 January 2020. The discovery was made using data collected by the European Space Agency's Gaia space observatory.

The wave was invisible in 2D, requiring new 3D techniques of mapping interstellar matter to reveal its pattern using the software Glue. The proximity of the wave surprised astronomers. It is named after the Radcliffe Institute for Advanced Study in Cambridge, Massachusetts, the place of study of the team.

== Structure and movement ==
The Radcliffe wave contains four of the five Gould Belt clouds:

- Orion molecular cloud complex
- Perseus molecular cloud
- Taurus molecular cloud
- Cepheus OB2

The cloud not within its scope is the Rho Ophiuchi Cloud complex, part of a linear structure parallel to the Radcliffe wave.

Other structures in the wave, further from the local star system, are Canis Major OB1, the North America Nebula and Cygnus X.

The mass of this structure is on the scale of $\geq3\times10^6$ M_{☉}. It has a length of 8,800 light-years (2,700 parsecs) and an amplitude of 520 light-years (160 parsecs). The Radcliffe wave occupies about 20% of the width and 40% of the length of the local arm (Orion Arm). The latter is more dispersed as to its interstellar medium than the wave and has further large star-forming regions such as Monoceros OB1, California Nebula, Cepheus Far, and Rho Ophiuchi.

A 2024 paper announced the discovery that the Radcliffe wave is oscillating in the form of a traveling wave.

== See also ==
- Antlia 2, another giant ripple across the Milky Way's disc found in data from the Gaia space telescope
- List of nearby stellar associations and moving groups
- Great Rift (astronomy)
- Serpens-Aquila Rift
