= Bajamar Star =

Star in the constellation Cygnus

- Image centered on the Bajamar Star (circled). The light from this intrinsically luminous, blue star is dimmed and reddened by the intervening dust.

Observation data Epoch J2000 Equinox ICRS
- Constellation: Cygnus
- Right ascension: 20^{h} 55^{m} 51.25562^{s}
- Declination: +43° 52′ 24.4639″
- Apparent magnitude (V): 13.087

Characteristics
- Spectral type: O3.5III(f*)+O8:
- Apparent magnitude (J): 6.356±0.018
- Apparent magnitude (H): 5.507±0.027
- Apparent magnitude (K): 5.041±0.020

Astrometry
Proper motion (μ)	RA: −0.205 mas/yr Dec.: −4.600 mas/yr
Parallax (π)	1.2670±0.0302 mas
Distance	2,570 ± 60 ly (790 ± 20 pc)

Details

A
Mass	72.96±0.54 M_{☉}
Temperature	42,750±190 K

B
Mass	33±8 M_{☉}

Other designations
- Bajamar Star, 2MASS J20555125+4352246, 1RXS J205549.4+435216

Database references
SIMBAD	data

The Bajamar Star (named after the Bahamas) is a binary star in the constellation Cygnus. Both stars are hot, massive O-type stars. It is the main ionizing star of the H II region formed by the North America and Pelican Nebulae, and is obscured by the dark cloud L935 that separates the two, so despite its high intrinsic luminosity, it is much too faint to be seen with the naked eye due to interstellar extinction.

== Discovery and naming ==
H II regions shine because their hydrogen gas is ionized by the ultraviolet radiation from a hot star. The ionizing star of the North America Nebula was proposed to be Deneb by Edwin Hubble in 1922, and HD 199579 by Sharpless and Osterbrock in 1952, but it soon became apparent that Deneb is not hot enough, and both stars are well away from the middle of the North America/Pelican Nebula complex (collectively called Sh 2-117). By 1958, George Herbig realized that the ionizing star had to lie behind the central dark cloud L935.

In 2004, European astronomers Fernando Comerón and Anna Pasquali searched for the ionizing star behind L935 at infrared wavelengths, using data from the 2MASS survey, and then made detailed observations of likely suspects with the 2.2 m telescope at the Calar Alto Observatory in Spain. One star, catalogued as 2MASS J20555125+4352246, fulfilled all the criteria. Lying right in the center of Sh 2-117, with a temperature of over 40,000 K, it is almost certainly the ionizing star of the nebula complex.

It was given the name Bajamar Star in 2016 after the original name of the Bahamas, Islas de Bajamar ("low-tide islands" in Spanish, because many of them are only easily seen from a ship during low tide), in reference to its position relative to the North America Nebula, just off the "Florida coast". This name was officially approved by the IAU Working Group on Star Names on 18 April 2026.

== Properties ==
This was originally reported as a spectral type O5V star. Later observations have revealed that it is a spectroscopic binary system, with the primary classified as O3.5III(f*), indicating a giant star with spectral peculiarities, and the secondary as type O8. The primary is the nearest known massive star with a spectral type earlier than O4; the nearest O4 star, Zeta Puppis (Naos), is less than half as far.

Although the light from the Bajamar Star is dimmed by 9.6 magnitudes (almost 10,000 times) and reddened by the dark cloud L935, it is faintly visible at optical wavelengths, at magnitude 13.1. If this star were seen undimmed, it would shine at magnitude 3.5, almost as bright as Albireo, the star marking the head of Cygnus.

The Bajamar Star is one of two O-type stars in the North America and Pelican Nebula complex; the other is HD 199579, nicknamed the Toronto star. Both stars are escaping from a group of stars dubbed the Bermuda cluster, following the same geographical nomenclature. They appear to have been ejected from the cluster around 1.5 million years ago.

== Location map ==
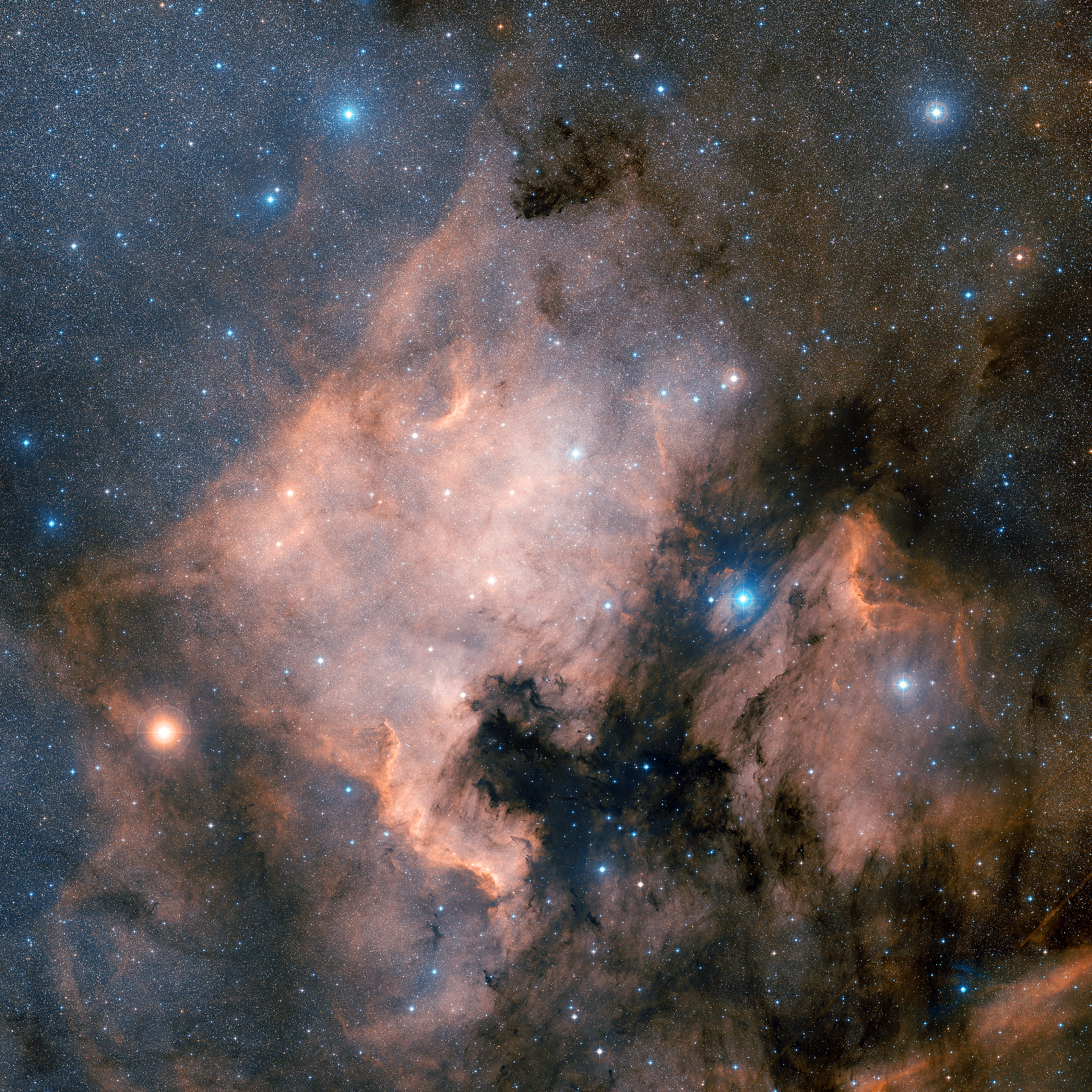
Location of the Bajamar Star (circled) in the North America Nebula
