= Serpens South =

Relatively dense cluster of more than 600 young stars

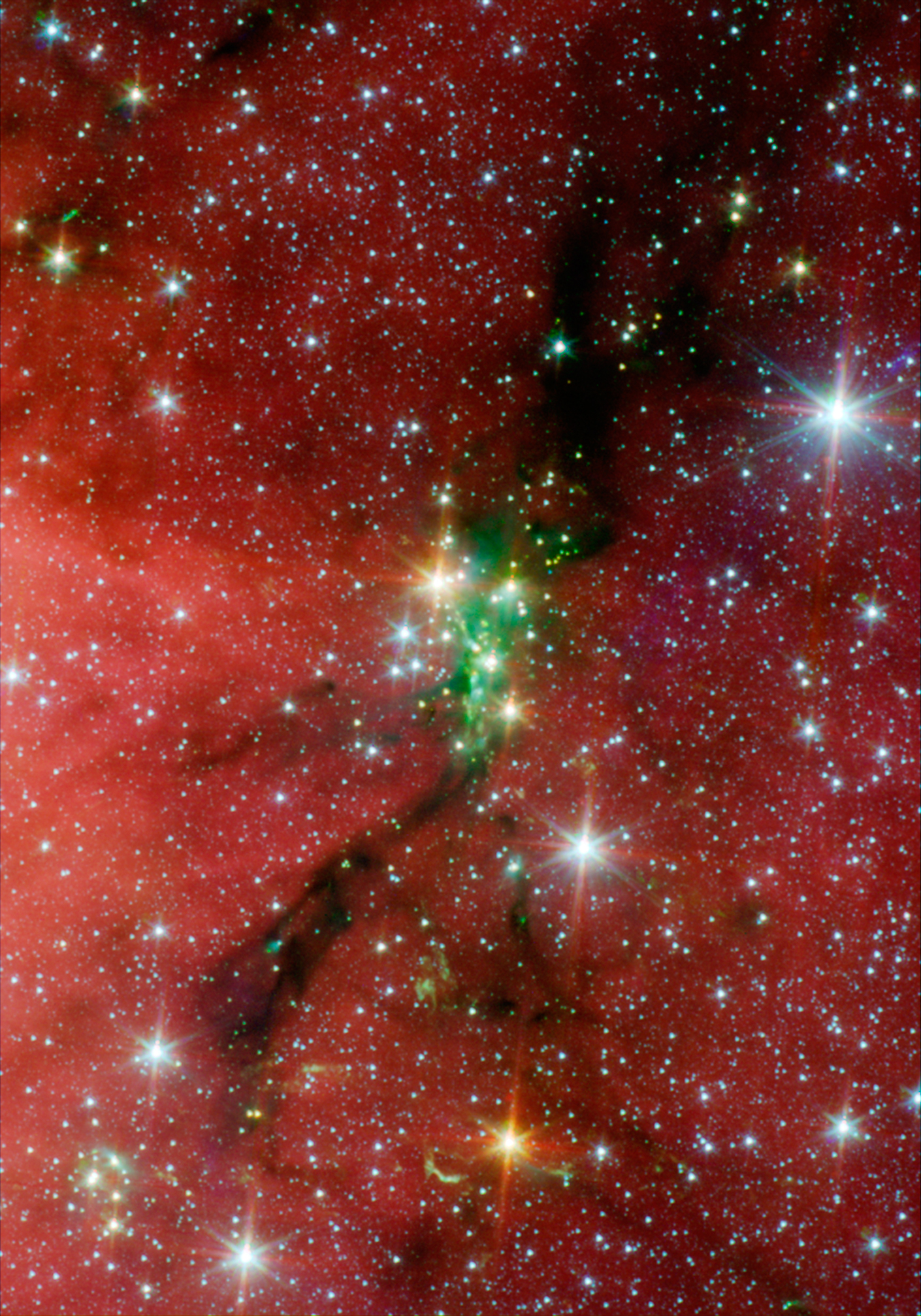
- A cluster of new stars called Serpens South. Courtesy of NASA/ESA

Observation data (J2000.0 epoch)
- Right ascension: 18^{h} 30^{m} 03.00^{s}
- Declination: −02° 01′ 58.2″
- Distance: 1,422±30 ly (436.0±9.2 pc)
- Apparent dimensions (V): 14.4 × 20.3 arcmins

Physical characteristics
- Radius: 3.5 × 5 ly

Associations
- Constellation: Serpens

The Serpens South star cluster is a relatively dense group of more than 600 young stars, dozens of which are protostars just beginning to form. The cluster is situated in the southern portion of the Serpens cloud (adjacent to the star-forming region known as W40). The stars are embedded in a dense filament of interstellar gas, which is part of the giant molecular cloud that has given rise to the cluster of young stars in W40. This entire complex is located at a distance of 1420 light-years (436 pc) from the Earth, and is approximately the same distance as the Serpens Main cluster.

The cluster was uncovered by NASA's Spitzer Space Telescope. This discovery was made possible by the infrared capabilities of this space telescope, which were necessary because the stars are completely obscured by interstellar dust in the Serpens cloud at visible wavelengths. Hundreds of young stellar objects have been detected at mid-infrared objects using these data. X-ray observations by NASA's Chandra X-ray Observatory have also provided detailed information about the stellar cluster. And, the region has served as a laboratory for radio-wavelength studies of star formation in dense molecular filaments.

The discovery of Serpens South is a direct result of the Gould's Belt Legacy project at the Center for Astrophysics | Harvard & Smithsonian, which aims to study all prominent star-forming regions within about 1,600 light-years of Earth. The Gould Belt is a ring of molecular clouds and associated star-forming regions first described by astronomer Benjamin Gould in 1879. Although the Serpens Molecular cloud is too distant to formally be considered a member of the Gould Belt, it is often included in Gould Belt surveys.

Serpens South is located half a degree west of the main W40 cluster and three degrees south of the Serpens Main cluster.

== Gallery ==
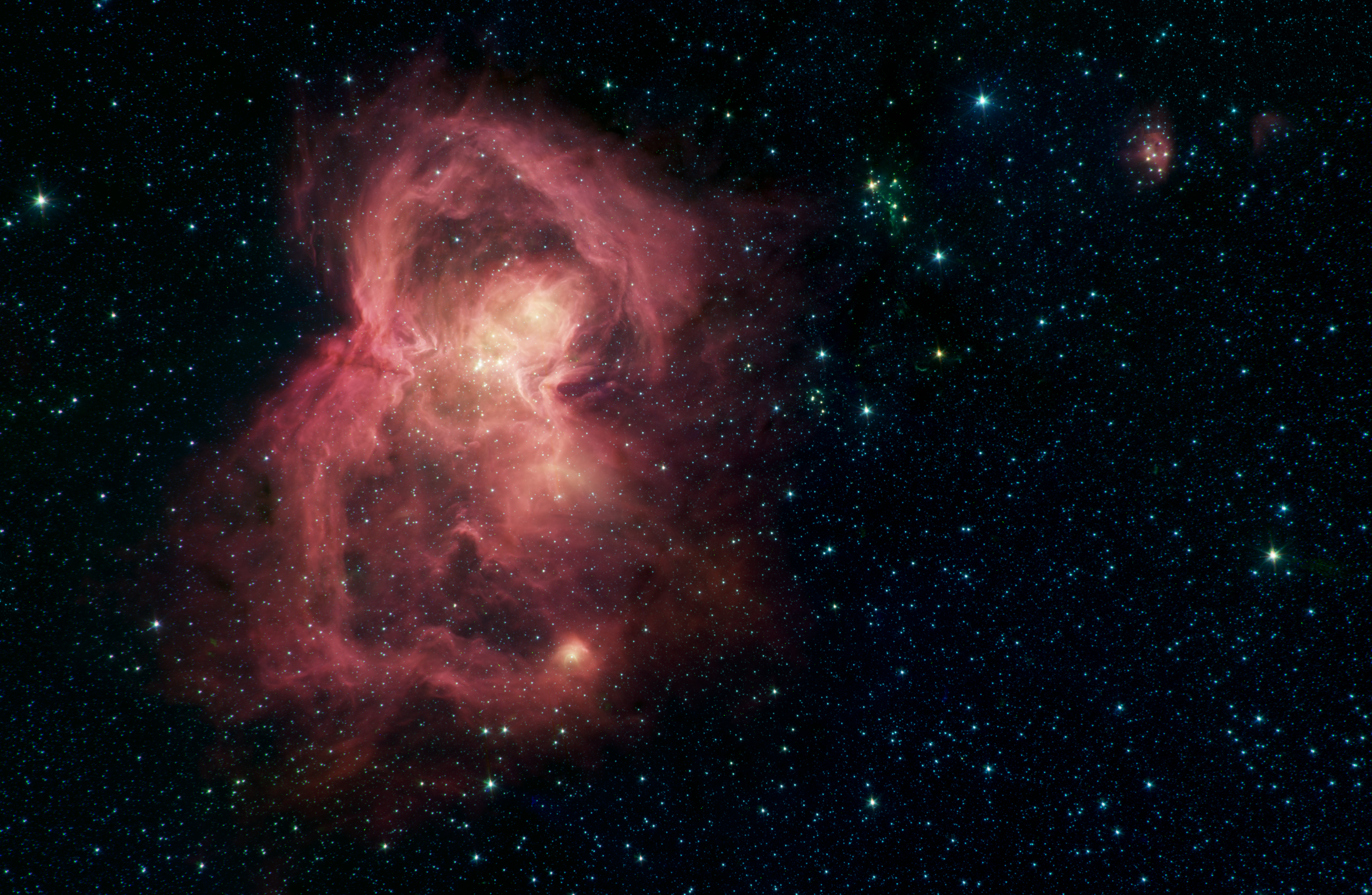
The Serpens South cluster can be seen as a small group of stars near the top of this large-scale Spitzer mosaic, just to the right of the center, while the neighboring W40 (left side of the image) dominates in the mid-infrared

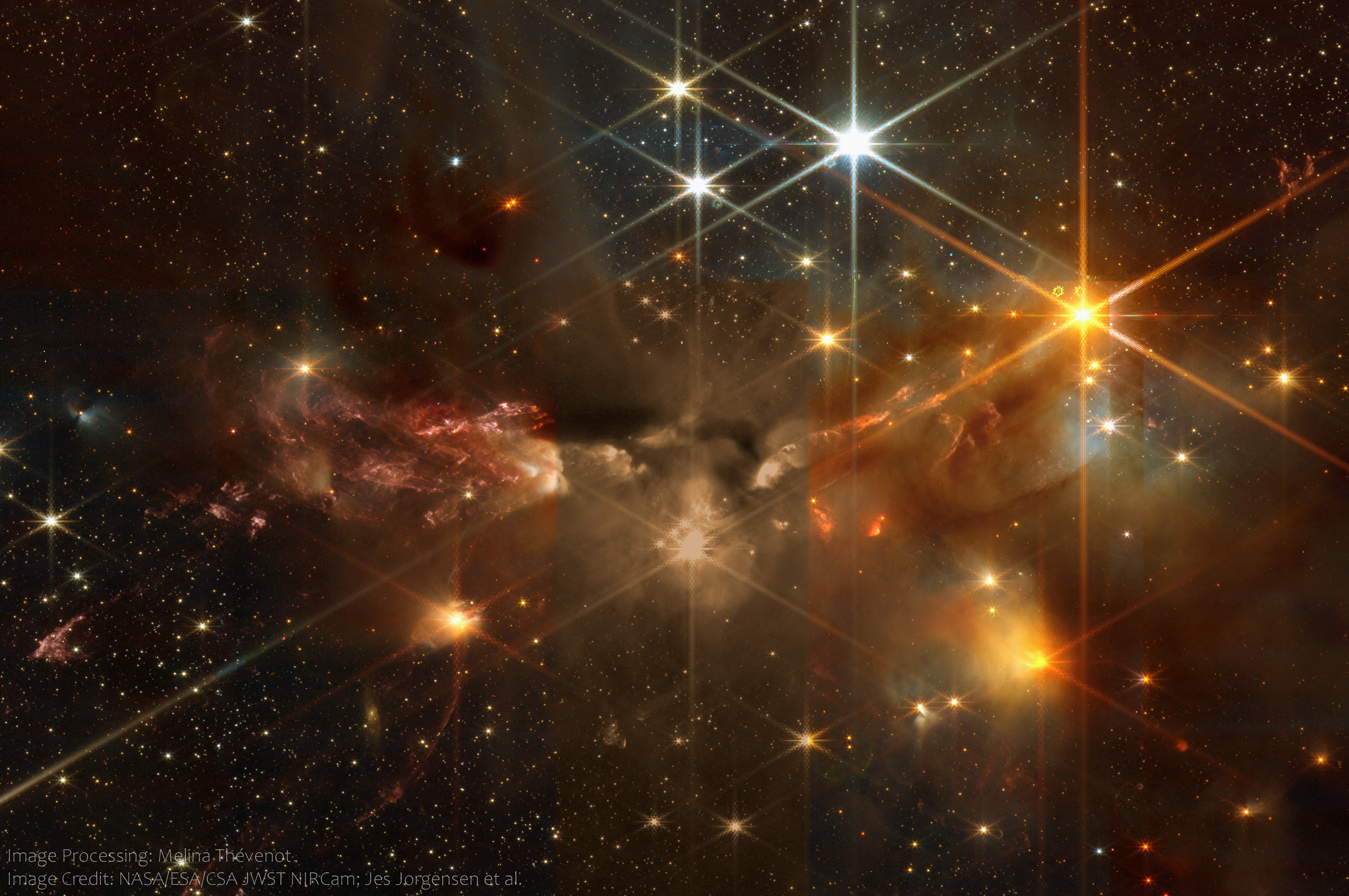
Detailed view of the Serpens South Cluster with JWST NIRCam.

== See also ==
- Serpens-Aquila Rift
- Star-Forming Regions
