= Great Rift =

Great Rift may mean:

== Geography ==
- Great Rift Valley, a geographical and geological feature, approximately 6,000 km in length, which runs from northern Syria in Southwest Asia to central Mozambique in East Africa which includes:
  - The East African Rift which includes:
    - Great Rift Valley, Kenya, a major rift valley in Kenya
    - Great Rift Valley, Ethiopia, a major rift valley in Ethiopia
- Great Rift of Idaho, a rift system in the US state of Idaho that is protected by Craters of the Moon National Monument and Preserve

== Astronomy ==
- The Great Rift (astronomy), a series of molecular dust clouds located between the Solar System and the Sagittarius Arm of the Milky Way Galaxy

== Media ==
- The Great Rift: Africa's Wild Heart, a nature documentary series

== Fictional ==
- The Great Rift (Forgotten Realms) of Faerûn within the Shining South, in Forgotten Realms, a campaign setting for the Dungeons & Dragons (D&D) fantasy role-playing game
