= HD 199579 =

Star in the constellation Cygnus

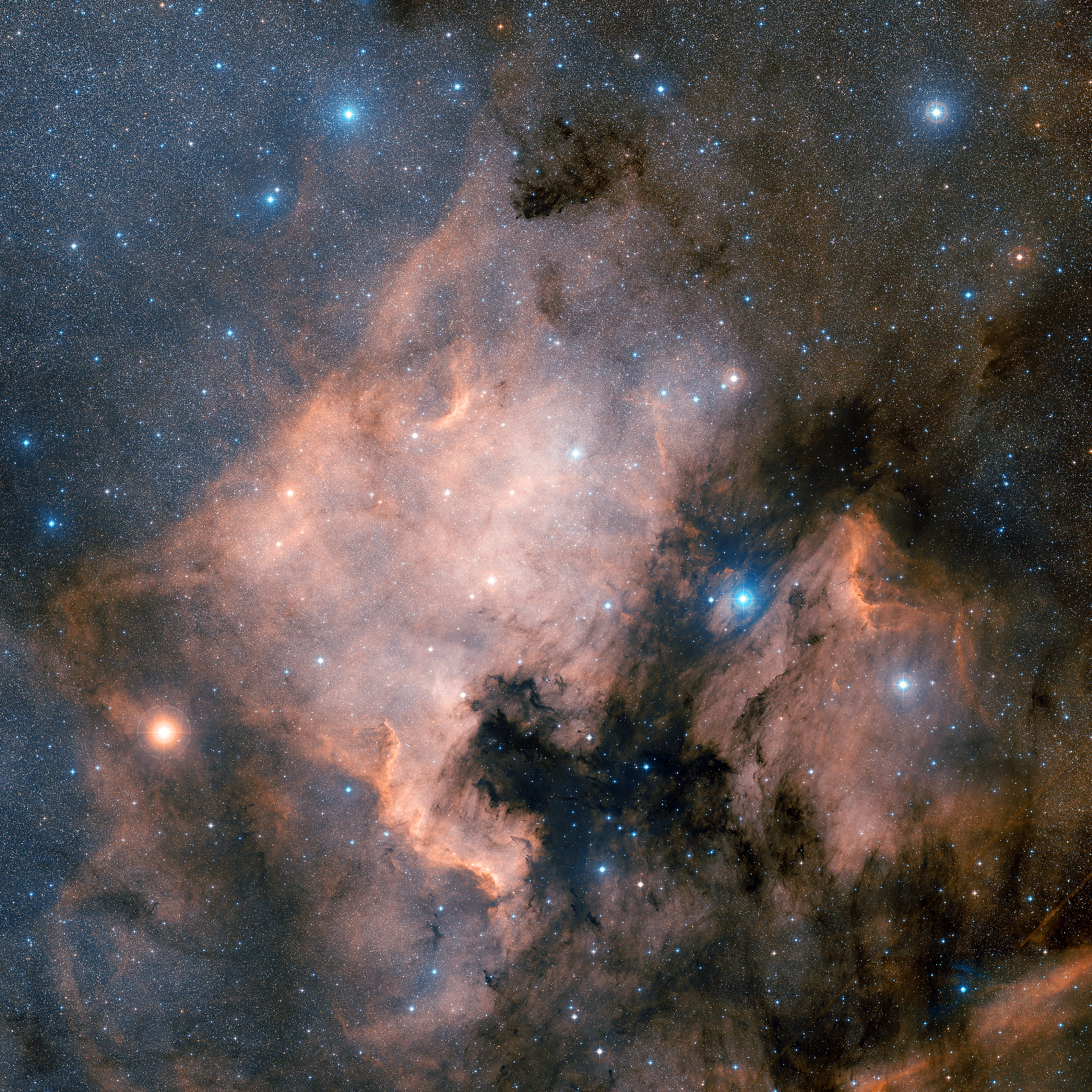
- Location of HD 199579 (circled) in the North America Nebula

Observation data Epoch J2000 Equinox ICRS
- Constellation: Cygnus
- Right ascension: 20^{h} 56^{m} 34.77791^{s}
- Declination: +44° 55′ 29.0009″
- Apparent magnitude (V): 5.96

Characteristics
- Spectral type: O6V((f)) + B1-2V
- B−V color index: 0.020

Astrometry
| Radial velocity (R_{v}) | −6.4±0.4 km/s |
| Proper motion (μ) | RA: +0.464 mas/yr Dec.: −2.129 mas/yr |
| Parallax (π) | 1.1507±0.0348 mas |
| Distance | 2,830 ± 90 ly (870 ± 30 pc) |
| Absolute magnitude (M_{V}) | −5.2 / −2.7 |

Orbit
| Period (P) | 48.5216±0.0015 d |
| Eccentricity (e) | 0.065±0.011 |
| Inclination (i) | 64±11° |
| Periastron epoch (T) | HJD 2422944.8±0.14 |
| Argument of periastron (ω) (secondary) | 94±12° |
| Semi-amplitude (K_{1}) (primary) | 40.4±0.6 km/s |

Details

A
| Mass | 33.10±0.42 M_{☉} |
| Temperature | 39,360±110 K |

B
| Mass | ~8 M_{☉} |

Other designations
- Toronto star, BD+44 3639, HD 199579, HIP 103371, HR 8023, SAO 50263

Database references
| SIMBAD | data |

HD 199579, nicknamed the Toronto star, is a binary star in the constellation Cygnus, within the North America Nebula. It is approximately 2,800 light-years (870 parsecs) from Earth. With an apparent magnitude of 5.96, it is faintly visible to the naked eye under ideal viewing conditions. Its nickname, first used in 2022, refers to the city of Toronto in reference to its position in the North America Nebula.

This is a spectroscopic binary; its orbit was first determined by John Stanley Plaskett in 1922. The primary component is an O-type main-sequence star with a stellar classification of O6V((f)), and the secondary is a B-type main-sequence star classified as B1V or B2V. The pair complete an orbit around each other in 48.5 days. The primary is a candidate magnetic O-type star.

HD 199579 is one of two O-type stars in the region of the North America and Pelican Nebulae; the other is the Bajamar Star, which is the main ionizing star of the nebula complex. HD 199579 had been proposed as the ionizing star by Sharpless and Osterbrock in 1952, but was found not to be. Both the Bajamar and Toronto stars are rapidly escaping in different directions from a group of stars which has been dubbed the Bermuda cluster. They appear to have been ejected from the cluster around 1.5 million years ago.
