= Benjamin Apthorp Gould =

American astronomer

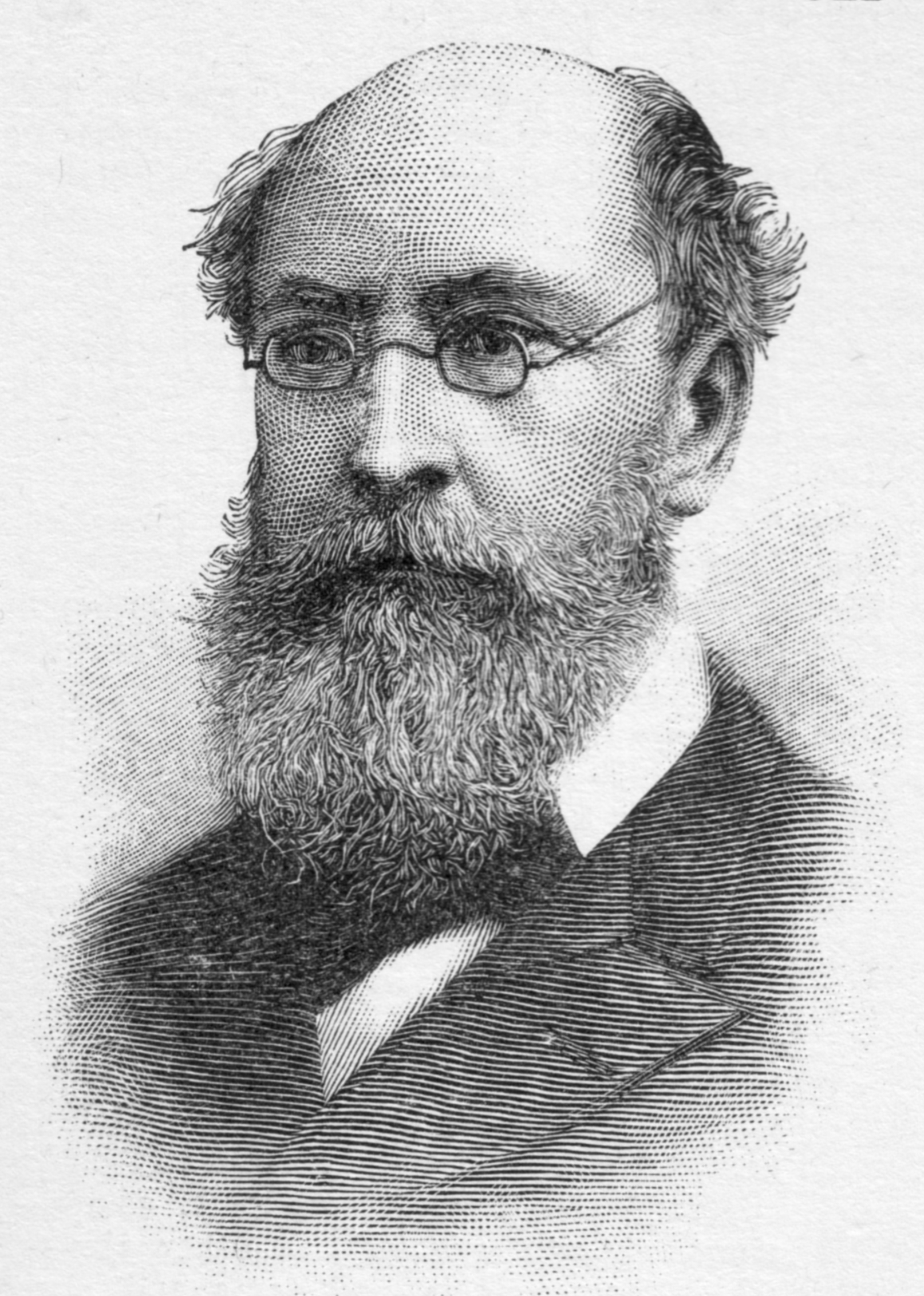
- Benjamin Apthorp Gould
- Born: September 27, 1824; Boston, Massachusetts
- Died: November 26, 1896 (aged 72); Cambridge, Massachusetts
- Education: Harvard College
- Known for: Astronomical Journal; Gould Belt; Gould designations
- Spouse: Mary Apthorp Quincy Gould
- Awards: James Craig Watson Medal 1887; Gold Medal of the RAS 1883
- Scientific career
- Fields: Astronomy

Benjamin Apthorp Gould (September 27, 1824 – November 26, 1896) was a pioneering American astronomer. He is noted for creating the Astronomical Journal, discovering the Gould Belt, and for founding of the Argentine National Observatory and the Argentine National Weather Service.

== Biography ==
He was born in Boston, Massachusetts, the son of Lucretia Dana (Goddard) and Benjamin Apthorp Gould, the principal of Boston Latin School, which the younger Gould attended. The poet Hannah Flagg Gould was his aunt. He studied at Harvard College under Benjamin Peirce, graduating in 1844. He studied mathematics and astronomy under C. F. Gauss at Göttingen, Germany, during which time he published approximately 20 papers on the observation and motion of comets and asteroids. Following completion of his Ph.D. (he was the first American to receive this degree in astronomy) he toured European observatories asking for advice on what could be done to further astronomy as a professional science in the U.S.A. The main advice he received was to start a professional journal modeled after what was then the world's leading astronomical publication, the Astronomische Nachrichten.

Gould returned to America in 1848 and from 1852 to 1867 worked in the United States Coast Survey, where he worked in geodetic astronomy and was in charge of the longitude department. He developed and organized the service, was one of the first to determine longitudes by telegraphic means, and employed the Atlantic cable in 1866 to establish accurate longitude-relations between Europe and America. One of his assistants and life-long mentee was Seth Carlo Chandler, who went on to discover the Chandler wobble.

After his return to Cambridge, Massachusetts, Gould started the Astronomical Journal in 1849, which he published until 1861. He resumed publication in 1885 and it is still published today. From 1855 to 1859 he acted as director of the Dudley Observatory at Albany, New York, and in 1859 published a discussion of the places and proper motions of circumpolar stars to be used as standards by the United States Coast Survey. In 1861 he undertook the enormous task of preparing for publication the records of astronomical observations made at the United States Naval Observatory since 1850.

In 1851 Gould suggested numbering asteroids in their order of discovery, and placing this number in a disk (circle) as the generic symbol of an asteroid. That same year, he was elected as a member to the American Philosophical Society.

In 1864 he was admitted to the Massachusetts Society of the Cincinnati to represent his grandfather Captain Benjamin Gould. In the 1890s he became an early member of the Massachusetts Society of the Sons of the American Revolution.

Appointed in 1862 actuary to the United States Sanitary Commission, he issued in 1869 an important volume of Investigations in the Military and Anthropological Statistics of American Soldiers. This study, informed by Gould's commitment to race science, purported to construct typologies of Black and Indigenous bodies, in particular. In 1864 he fitted up a private observatory at Cambridge, Massachusetts, and undertook in 1868, on behalf of the Argentine republic, to organize a national observatory at Córdoba. In 1871 he became the first director of the Argentine National Observatory (today, Observatorio Astronómico de Córdoba of the National University of Córdoba). While there, he and four assistants (including Miles Rock) extensively mapped the southern hemisphere skies using newly developed photometric methods. On June 1, 1884, he made the last definite sighting of the Great Comet of 1882. The need of astronomers for good weather prediction spurred Gould to collaborate with Argentine colleagues to develop the Argentine National Weather Service, the first in South America.

Gould's measurements of L. M. Rutherfurd's photographs of the Pleiades in 1866 entitle him to rank as a pioneer in the use of the camera as an instrument of precision; and he secured at Córdoba 1400 negatives of southern star clusters, the reduction of which occupied the closing years of his life. He remained in Argentina until 1885, when he returned to Cambridge, Massachusetts. He received the Gold Medal of the Royal Astronomical Society in 1883 and the James Craig Watson Medal in 1887. Astronomers continue to investigate the astrophysics of a large scale feature of the Milky Way to which he called their attention in 1877, and honor him with its name, The Gould Belt. A crater on the Moon is named after him. Gould was elected a member of the American Antiquarian Society in 1892. He died at Cambridge, Massachusetts in 1896.

=== Uranography ===
In 1874, while in Argentina with his assistants, Gould completed his greatest work, the Uranometria Argentina, consisting of an atlas published in 1877 and catalog in 1879, for which he received in 1883 the gold medal of the Royal Astronomical Society. The atlas introduced the system of defining constellation boundaries along lines of right ascension and declination, which was officially adopted by the International Astronomical Union for the whole sky in 1930. The catalog assigned Gould designations to all bright stars within 100 degrees of the south celestial pole in a manner similar to what Flamsteed had earlier done for the northern hemisphere. An updated version, to which late 20th century data have been appended to the complete information for all stars in the original Uranometria Argentina, is available at www.uranometriaargentina.com/.

Gould followed his Uranometria Argentina with a zone-catalogue of 73,160 stars (1884), and a general catalogue (1885) compiled from meridian observations of 32,448 stars.

== Personal life ==
Alice Bache Gould (1868–1953), a mathematician, philanthropist, and historian, was one of his five children.

== See also ==
- Gould Belt
- Gould Belt Survey
