= Gould Belt =

Ring of stars in the Milky Way galaxy

Mesh map of the inner Gould Belt created from Gaia observatory data

The Gould Belt is a local ring of stars in the Milky Way, tilted away from the galactic plane by about 16–20 degrees, first reported by John Herschel and Benjamin Gould in the 19th century. It contains many O- and B-type stars, and many of the nearest star-forming regions of the local Orion Arm, to which the Sun belongs. The relative proximity of these star-forming regions spurred the Gould Belt Survey project to determine what caused them.

It was long speculated that the belt was a physical structure in the galactic disk, but data from the Gaia survey indicate that several of its star-forming regions belong instead to the separate Radcliffe wave and split linear structures in the Orion Arm, and that the circular appearance of the belt results mostly from the projection of these structures onto the celestial sphere.

The belt contains bright, young stars which formed about 30 to 50 million years ago in several constellations. These lie along a great circle slightly inclined to the Milky Way. including (in order from Taurus): Taurus, Perseus, Cepheus, Lacerta, Scorpius, Lupus, southern Centaurus, Crux (the Southern Cross), Carina, Vela, Puppis, Canis Major, and Orion.

Star-forming regions and OB associations that make up this region include the Orion Nebula and the Orion molecular clouds, the Scorpius–Centaurus OB association, Cepheus OB2, Perseus OB2, and the Taurus–Auriga molecular clouds. The Serpens molecular cloud containing star-forming regions W40 and Serpens south is often included in Gould Belt surveys, but is not formally part of the Gould Belt due to its greater distance.

A theory proposed around 2009 suggests that the Gould Belt formed about 30 million years ago when a blob of dark matter collided with the molecular cloud in our region. There is also evidence for similar Gould belts in other galaxies.

== See also ==
- Local Bubble – Milky Way superbubble
- Local Interstellar Cloud – Interstellar cloud in the Milky Way Galaxy
- Orion Arm – Minor spiral arm of the Milky Way galaxy; contains the Solar System
- Perseus Arm – One of two major spiral arms of the Milky Way galaxy
