= Gould Belt Survey =

Astronomical survey

- Website: lweb.cfa.harvard.edu/gouldbelt/

The Gould Belt Survey is an astronomical research project led by the Center for Astrophysics | Harvard & Smithsonian, with the participation of several other institutions.

The astronomers use observations and data captured by the Spitzer Space Telescope and other telescopes to create a complete picture of the star forming regions within an approximately 1600 light-year radius centered on the Solar System. These regions are partly or completely clouded by interstellar dust and therefore cannot be observed by telescopes using visible light, like the Hubble Space Telescope.

The Gould Belt survey team uses a variety of telescopes and observatories to study multiple aspects of star formation. The Spitzer Space Telescope provides imagery and observations made in the infrared spectrum, while for example the James Clerk Maxwell Telescope provides images from the submillimeter wavelength region of the spectrum.

The Herschel Space Observatory telescope provided observation data between the far infrared and the sub-millimeter wavelengths, effectively covering wavelengths between the observational capabilities of the Spitzer and the Maxwell telescopes.

== Observation results ==
Regions surveyed include clouds in Scorpius, Lupus, Musca, Chamaeleon, the Serpens-Aquila Rift and W40, Cepheus, and IC 5146. The first observations by the Spitzer Space Telescope were completed between September 21–27, 2006. The first region that has been surveyed is IC5146 (the Cocoon Nebula in Cygnus). The first details of the research were presented at a meeting of the American Astronomical Society in Seattle.

Based on these observations, the team of astronomers led by Robert Gutermuth, of the Center for Astrophysics | Harvard & Smithsonian reported the discovery of Serpens South, a cluster of 50 young stars in the constellation Serpens.

The research team also released a poster which covers the details of the research and the results presented at the AAS meeting.

== Related projects ==
The data from this project will be used in combination with observations from the James Clerk Maxwell Telescope, Herschel Space Observatory, and previous Spitzer observations from the "Cores to Disks" Legacy program and from various Guaranteed Time and General Observer programs that studied star-forming regions within Gould's Belt.
