= Great Rift (astronomy) =

Interstellar clouds of cosmic dust

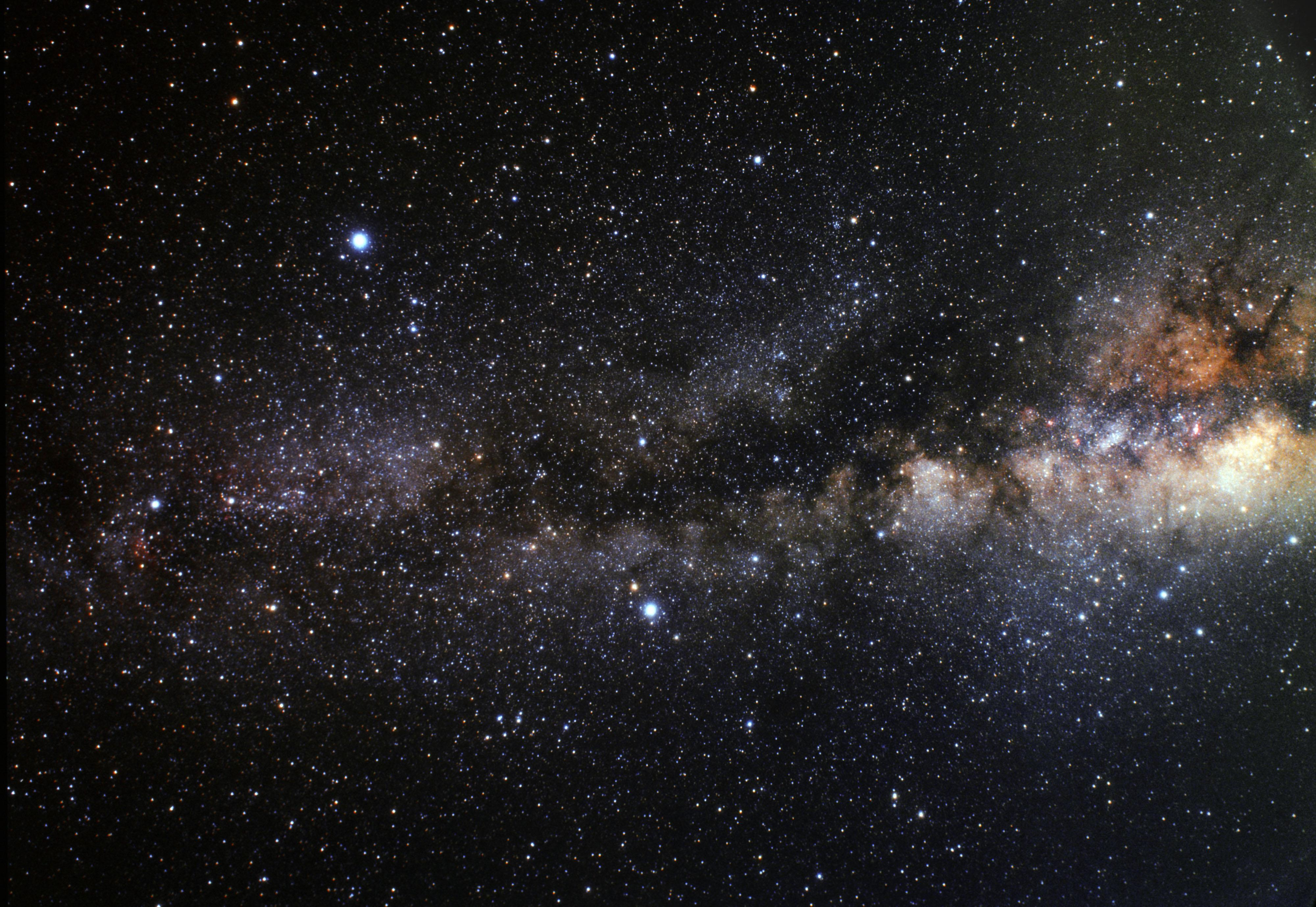
This overexposed photo shows just over half of the inward bulk of the Milky Way (including its centre). As in all real images from our Arm of the galaxy, much is obscured by the Great Rift (dark dust clouds that span from Cygnus to Centaurus).

In astronomy, the Great Rift (sometimes called the Dark Rift or less commonly the Dark River) is a dark band caused by interstellar clouds of cosmic dust that significantly obscure (extinguish) the center and most radial sectors of the Milky Way galaxy from Earth's perspective.

In dark, clear night skies, the rift appears as clear as the bright bulge of stars around the Galactic Center does to the naked eye or binoculars. The rift is largely between the Solar System (which is close to the inner edge of the Orion Arm) and the next arm, inward, the Sagittarius Arm. The clouds are an obstruction to millions of the galaxy's stars detected at visible wavelengths, which compose a bright hazy band appearing 30° wide and arching through the night sky. The clouds within our radial sector of the galaxy span about 800–1,000 parsecs (2,600–3,300 ly) from Earth. The clouds are estimated to contain about 1 million solar masses of plasma and dust.

== Properties ==
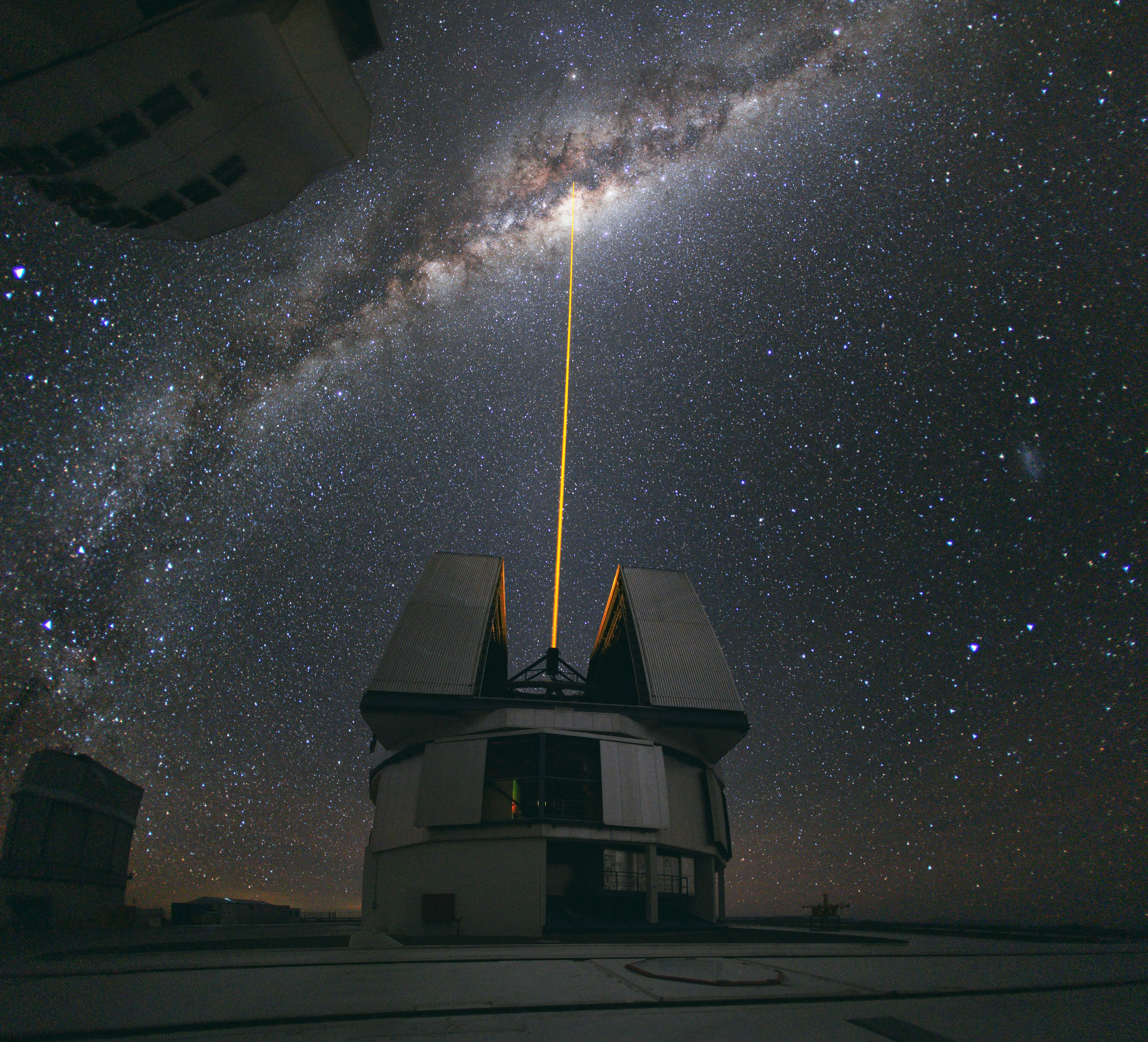
View of the Milky Way and Great Rift from ESO's Very Large Telescope

To the naked eye, the Great Rift appears as a dark lane that divides the bright band of the Milky Way vertically. The Great Rift covers one third of the Milky Way, and is flanked by strips of numerous stars, such as the Cygnus Star Cloud. West of the Cepheus Clouds, the Funnel cloud/Le Gentil 3 and the bordering North America Nebula, the Great Rift starts with the Northern Coalsack at the constellation of Cygnus, where it is known as the Cygnus Rift. The Great Rift stretches from there over the Serpens-Aquila Rift; to Ophiuchus, where it broadens out; to Sagittarius, where it obscures the Galactic Center; essentially ending at Centaurus.

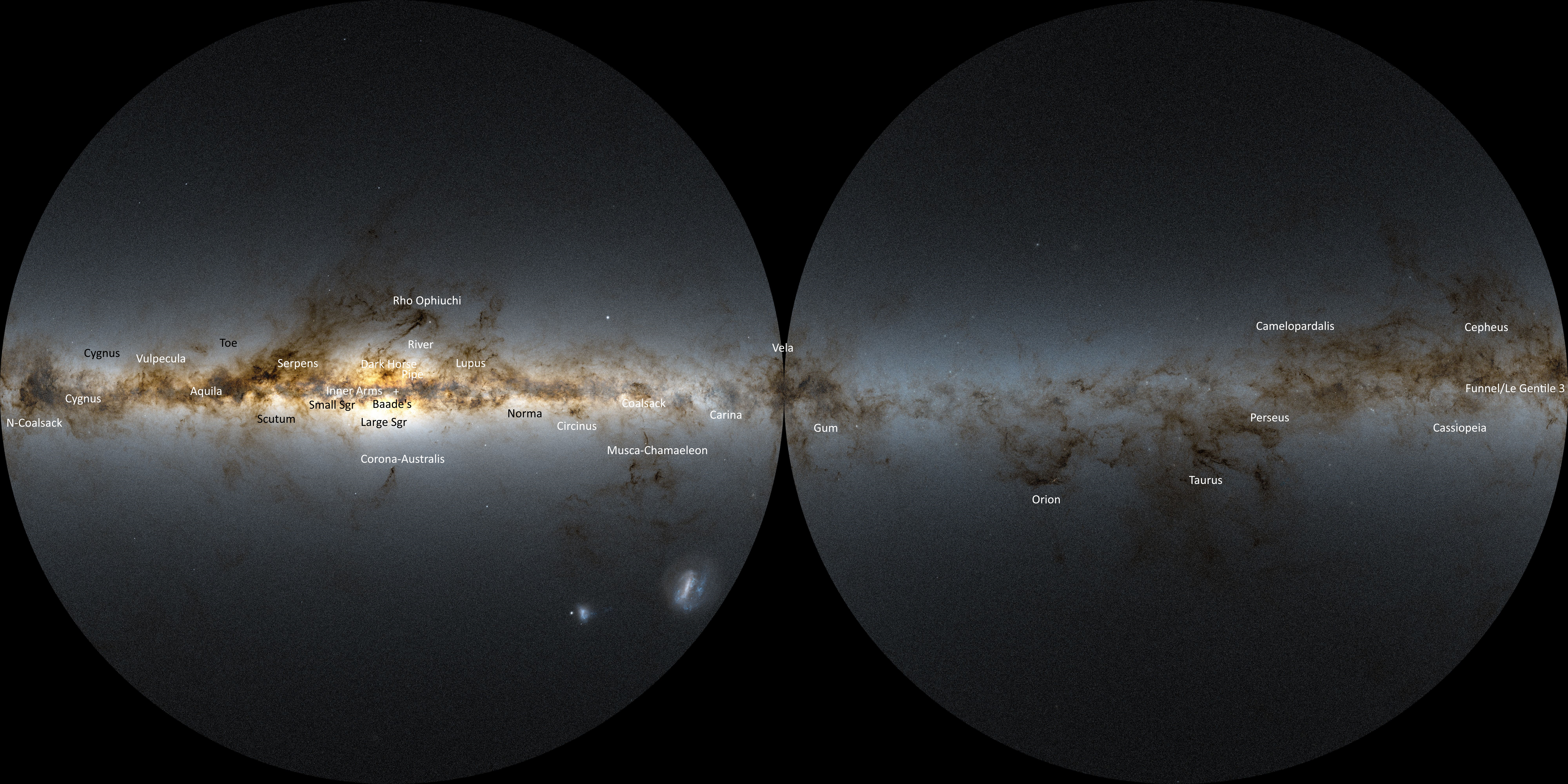
Overview of the Milky Way as seen by Gaia, with prominent dark features and star clouds labelled. The Great Rift extends from the far left across the galactic field of stars.

One of the regions obscured by the Great Rift is the Cygnus OB2 association, a cluster of young stars and one of the largest regions of star formation within 2 kiloparsecs. Similar dark rifts can be seen in many edge-on galaxies, such as NGC 891 in Andromeda and NGC 4565 (the Needle Galaxy) in Coma Berenices.

== Human observation ==
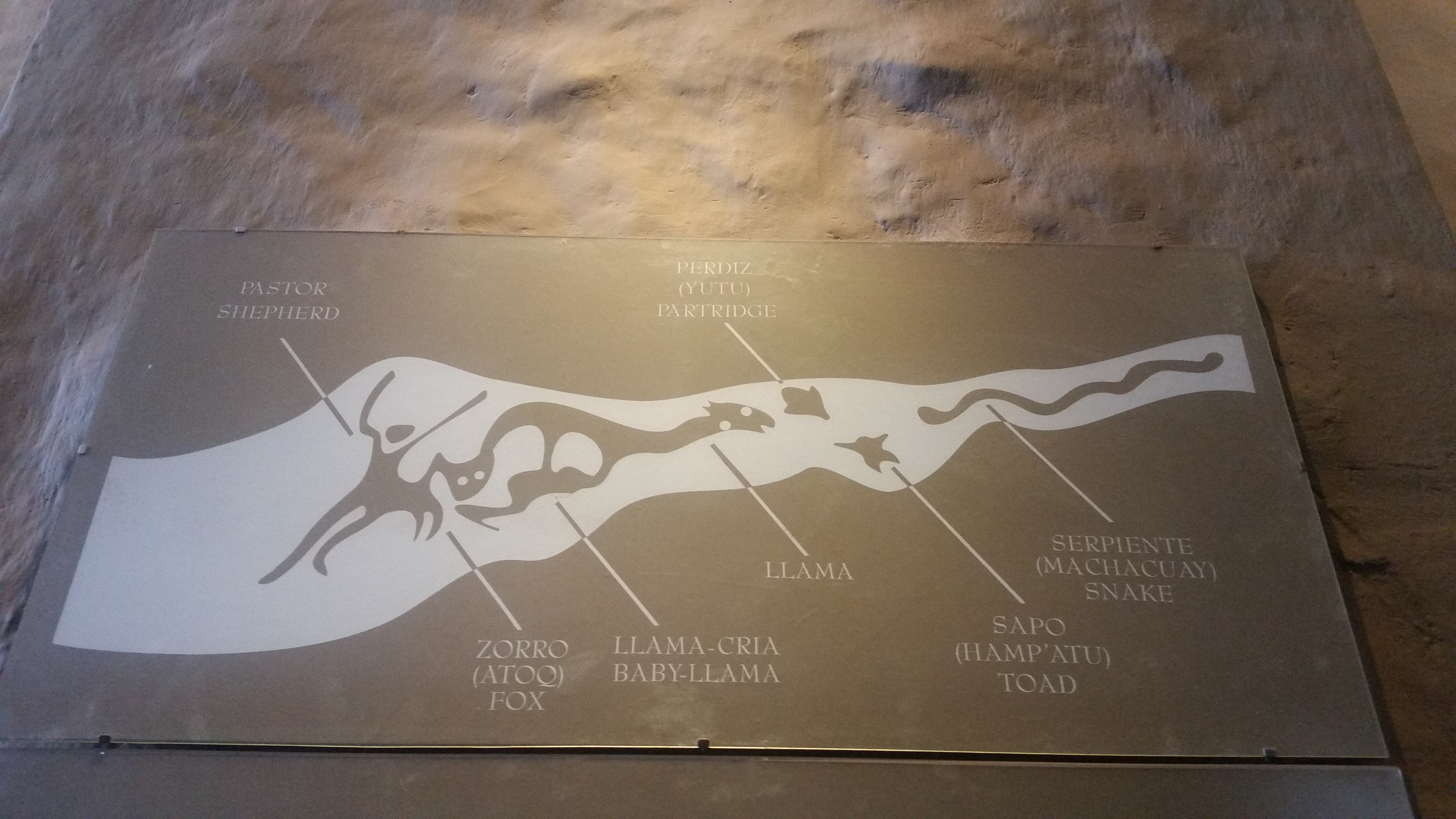
Layout of some Great Rift "constellations" as represented by the Inca

Dark zones obscuring the night-sky lighting mass of the bulk of the Milky Way in a dry atmosphere (or at long exposures) were recognized by many ancient civilizations in which a seasonally or regularly dry climate is a frequent feature. In South America, the Inca gave some patterns of darkness and stars names much as normal stellar constellations were, including a series of animals like llamas, a fox, toad, and others, thought to be drinking from the "great river" (the Milky Way) and seen in silhouette.

The classical Greeks sometimes described the Great Rift as being the path of devastation left by Phaeton, who tried to guide the chariot of Helios (the Sun god) across the sky before losing control, wreaking havoc, and finally being struck down by a lightning bolt of Zeus.

Modern astronomy first began to notice the rift in the 18th century, but struggled to explain it until E. E. Barnard and Max Wolf in the early 20th century, who produced the currently accepted explanation after careful photographic study.

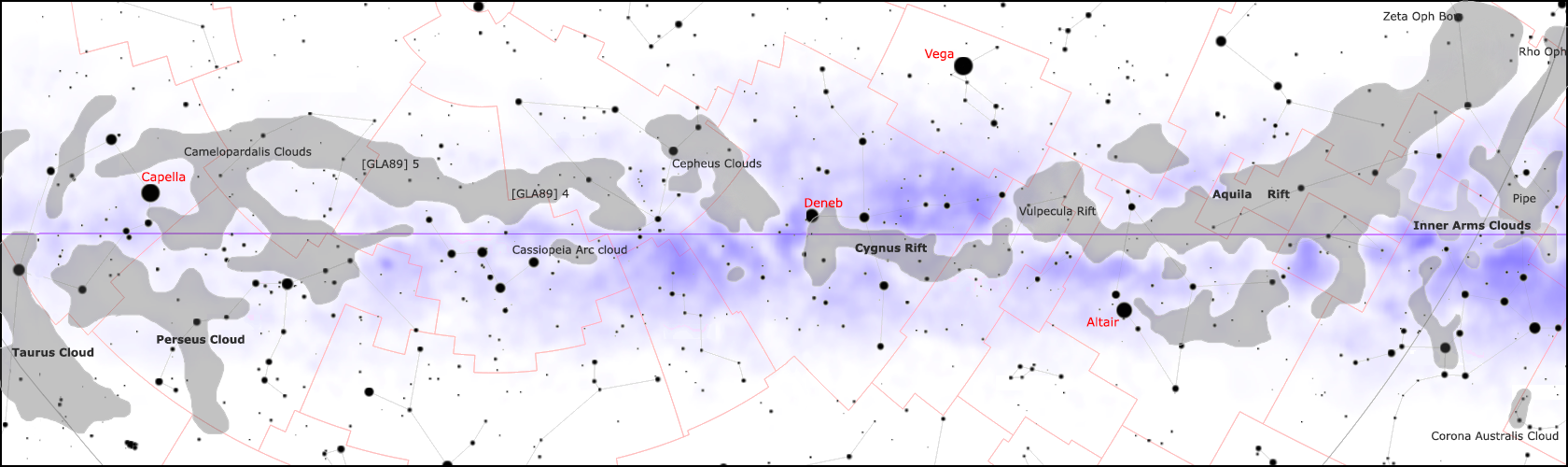
Main dark nebulae of the Solar apex half of the galactic plane, with the Cygnus and Aquila Rifts of the Great Rift at the center right. On the left are the dark clouds of the Radcliffe Wave.

Of this, Barnard said:

I did not at first believe in these dark obscuring masses. The proof was not conclusive. The increase of evidence, however, from my own photographs convinced me later, especially after investigating some of them visually, that many of these markings were not simply due to an actual want of stars but were really obscuring bodies nearer to us than the distant stars. — Astrophysical Journal (1919)

== See also ==
- Coalsack Nebula
- Dark-cloud constellations
- Emu in the sky (a continuation from Scorpius to Crux)
- Large Sagittarius Star Cloud
- Serpens-Aquila Rift, a sub-feature of the Great Rift
- Small Sagittarius Star Cloud
