= Glue (software) =

Data visualization software

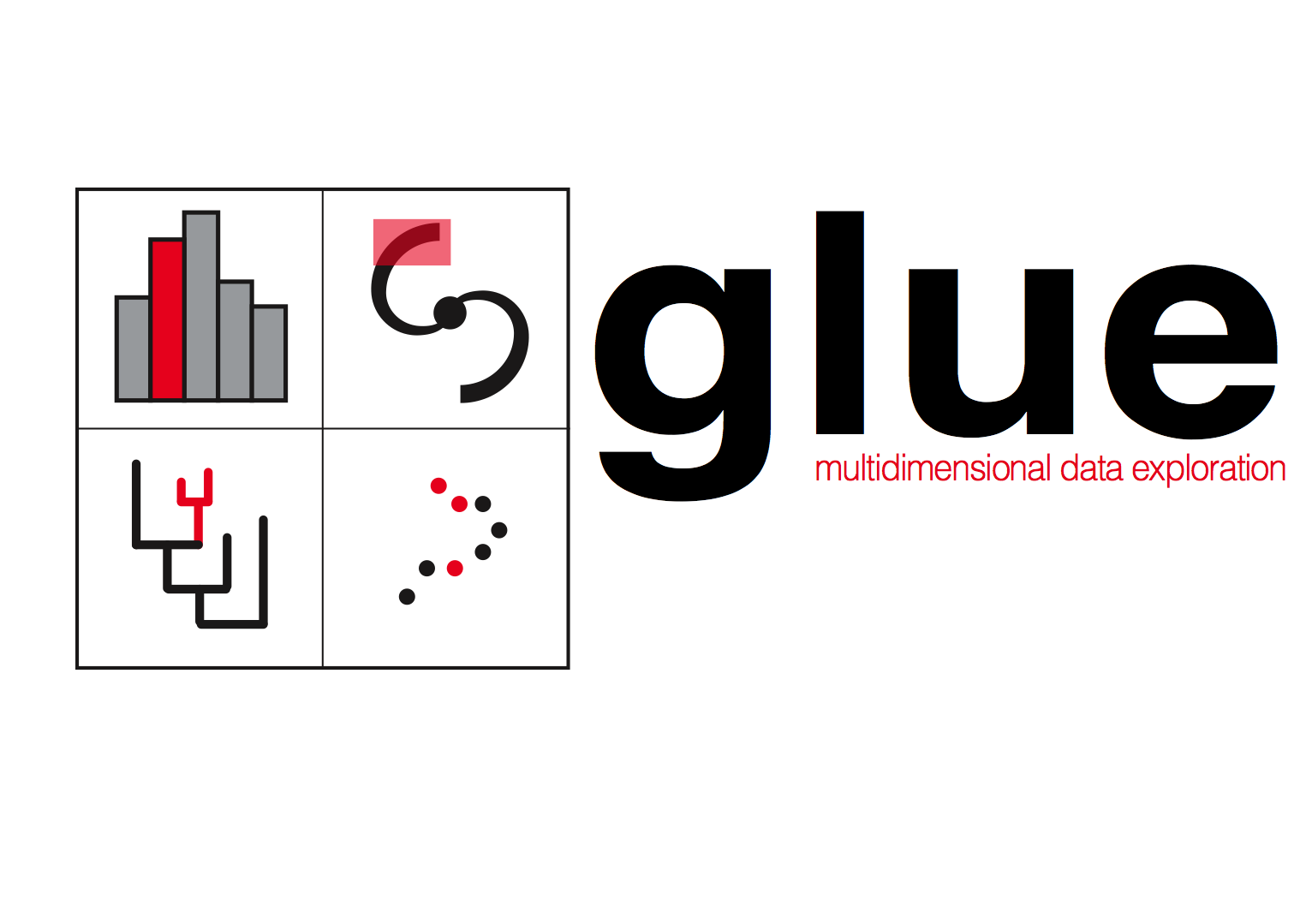
glue logo

glue (styled with a lower-case "g") is an interactive linked-view data visualization package for exploring relationships within and between related datasets.

== Software ==
glue, as working visualization software, was created and realized in 2012, after being described as a work-in-progress in Principles of High-Dimensional Data Visualization in Astronomy.

Using glue, users can create scatter plots, histograms, tables, and images (2D and 3D) of their data. glue is focused on the brushing and linking paradigm, where selections in any graph propagate to all others. glue uses the logical links that exist between different data sets to overlay visualizations of different data, and to propagate selections across data sets. These links are specified by the user, and are arbitrarily flexible. glue is written in Python, and built on top of its standard scientific libraries (i.e., Numpy, Matplotlib, Scipy, Vispy). glue is distributed as part of the Anaconda Python distribution, and is available on MacOS X, Linux, and Windows platforms.

glue offers a high-level of customization, and users can easily integrate their own Python code for data input, export, cleaning, and analysis. Examples of customization include automatically loading and cleaning data before starting glue, writing custom functions to parse files in a preferred file format, writing custom functions to link datasets, or creating custom data viewers.

glue is being used on astronomy data of star forming-clouds, medical data including brain scans, and many other kinds of data. Several plugins exist to extend glue's functionality to a wide range of fields. These include glue-medical to parse medical imaging data (e.g. DICOM files), glue-geospatial for GIS visualization, glue-openspace to interface with the OpenSpace planetarium software, and glue-wwt to support interoperability with the WorldWide Telescope software.

In 2019, glue gained attention for its role in astronomers' discovery of the Radcliffe wave, an enormous gaseous structure that was only able to be seen with the assistance of new 3D mapping techniques. In 2023, glue played an instrumental role in the discovery and rendering in Augmented reality of a Superbubble between Perseus (constellation) and Taurus (constellation).

Originally built on the Qt GUI framework for use on the desktop, an entirely browser-based version of glue (glupyter) is being developed for the Project Jupyter ecosystem, including Jupyter notebooks and JupyterLab.
