= Serpens–Aquila Rift =

Sky region containing dark interstellar clouds

Serpens-Aquila Rift
Dark nebula
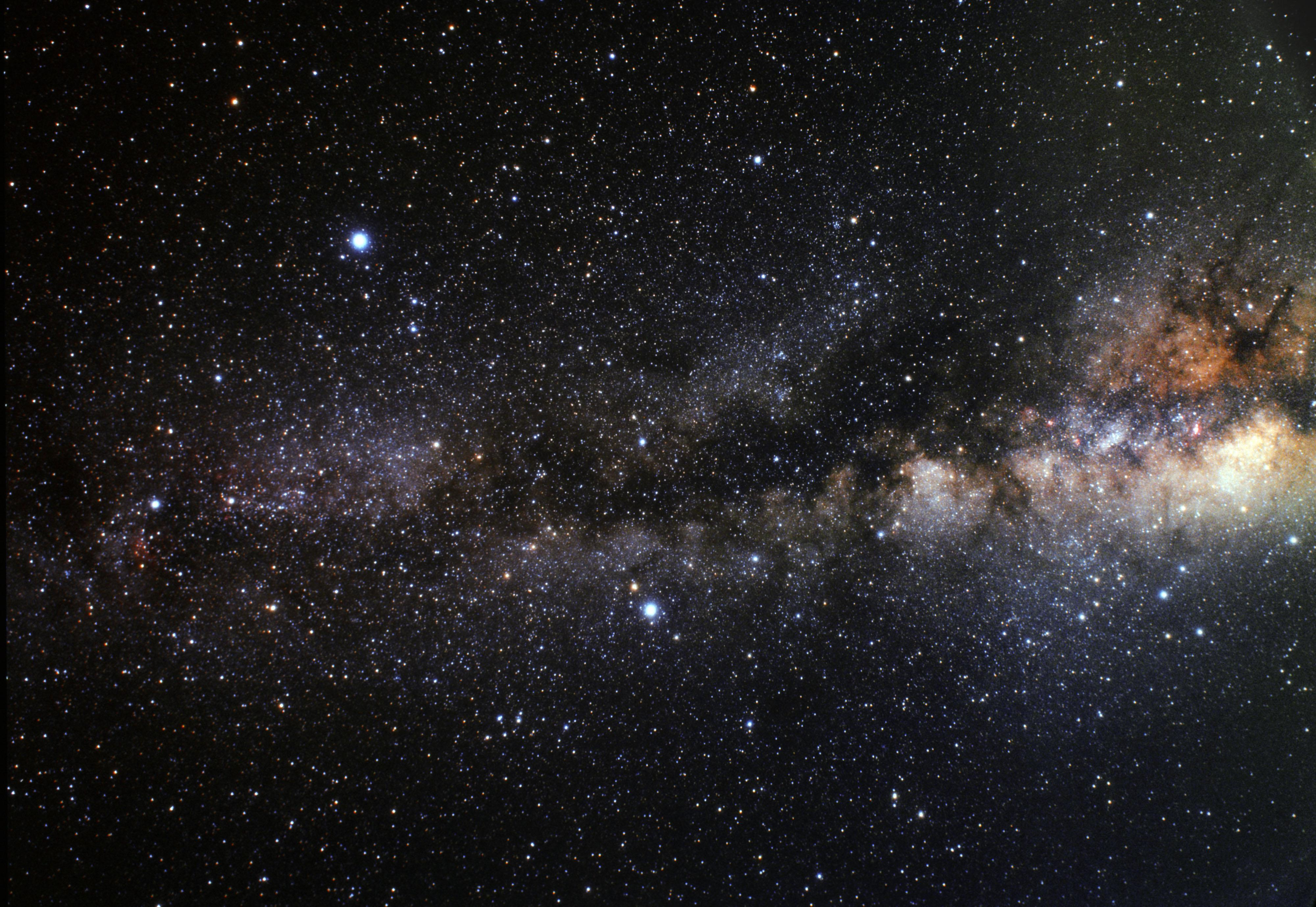
- In this image of the Milky Way, the Aquila Rift is the dark patch right of center. It is part of the Great Rift which can be seen bisecting the swath of star light seen in the galactic plane.

Observation data: J2000.0 epoch
- Right ascension: 19^{h} 07^{m}
- Declination: +01° 00′
- Distance: 750–1650 ly (225–500 pc)
- Apparent dimensions (V): 20 × 10°
- Constellation: Aquila, Serpens, Ophiuchus
- Notable features: –
- Designations: Aquila Rift

The Serpens–Aquila Rift (also known as the Aquila Rift) is a region of the sky in the constellations Aquila, Serpens Cauda, and eastern Ophiuchus containing dark interstellar clouds. The region forms part of the Great Rift, the nearby dark cloud of cosmic dust that obscures the middle of the galactic plane of the Milky Way, looking inwards and towards its other radial sectors. The clouds that form this structure are called "molecular clouds", constituting a phase of the interstellar medium which is cold and dense enough for molecules to form, particularly molecular hydrogen (H_{2}). These clouds are opaque to light in the optical part of the spectrum due to the presence of interstellar dust grains mixed with the gaseous component of the clouds. Therefore, the clouds in the Serpens-Aquila Rift block light from background stars in the disk of the Galaxy, forming the dark rift. The complex is located in a direction towards the inner Galaxy, where molecular clouds are common, so it is possible that not all components of the rift are at the same distance and physically associated with each other.

Several star-forming regions are projected in (or near) the direction of the Serpens-Aquila Rift, including Westerhout 40 (W40), Serpens Cluster, Serpens South, Serpens NH_{3}, and MWC297/Sh2-62.

== Distance ==
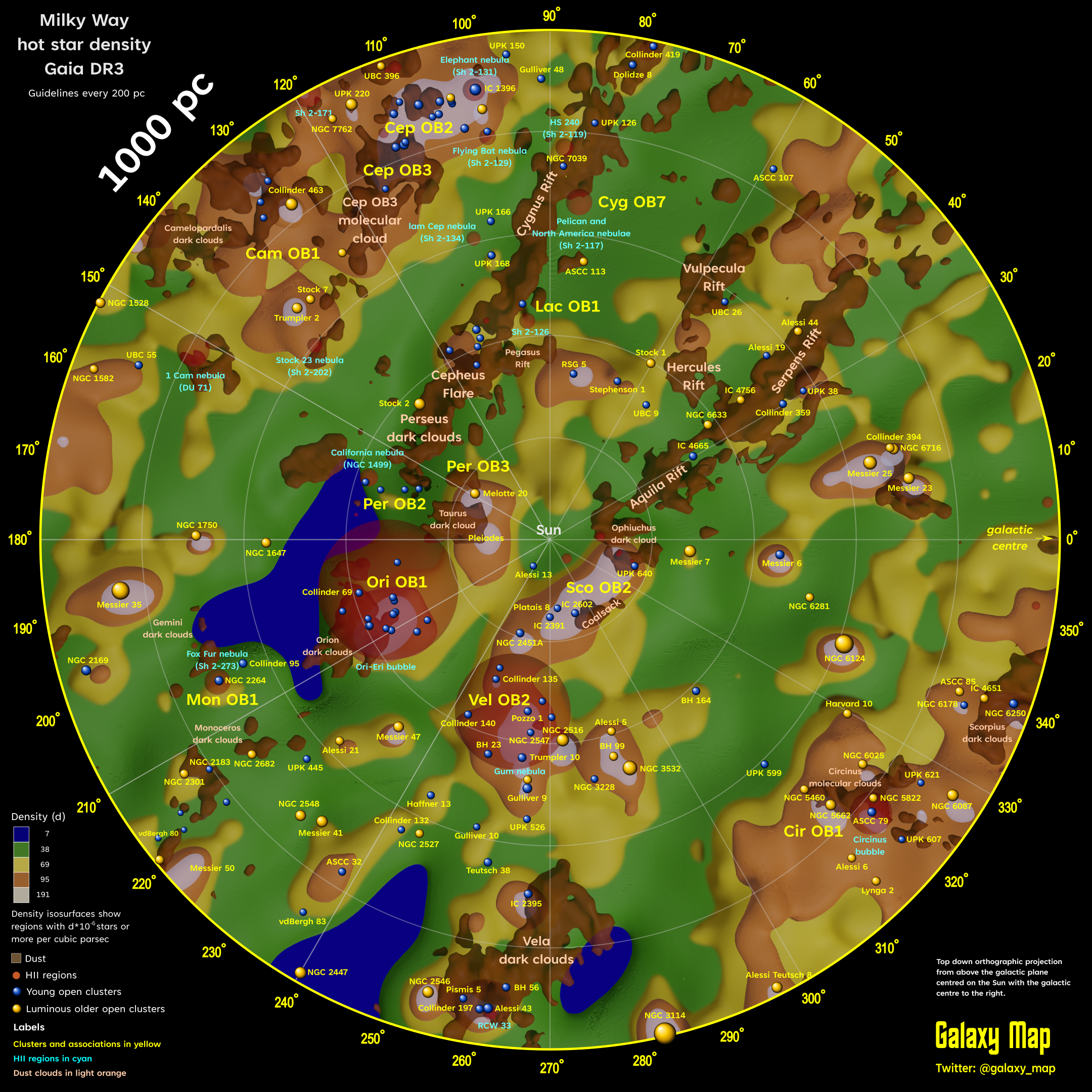
Map of the star local neighborhood within 1,000 pc (3,300 ly), the Sun is at the center. The Serpens–Aquila Rift is at 40° galactic longitude, from the center moving outwards to top-right.

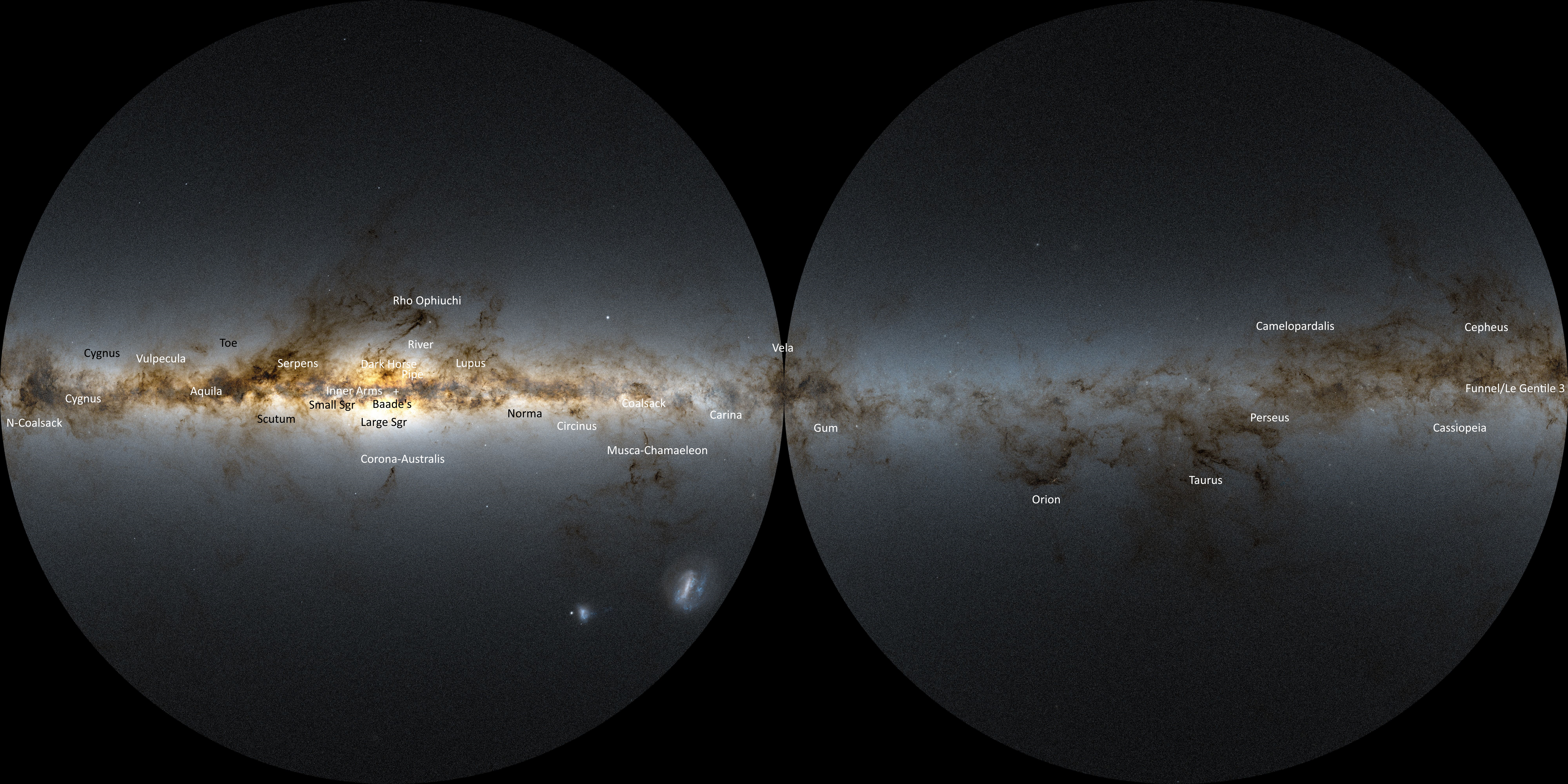
The Milky Way as seen by Gaia, with prominent dark features labeled in white, as well as prominent star clouds labeled in black.

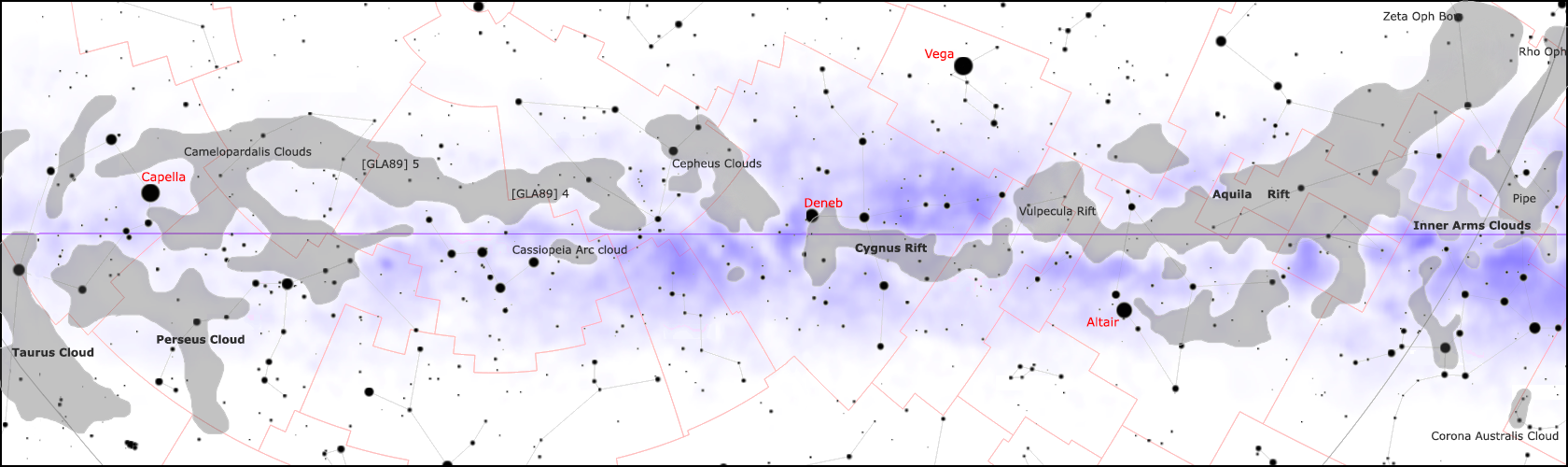
Main dark nebulae of the Solar apex half of the galactic plane, with the Aquila Rift on the right

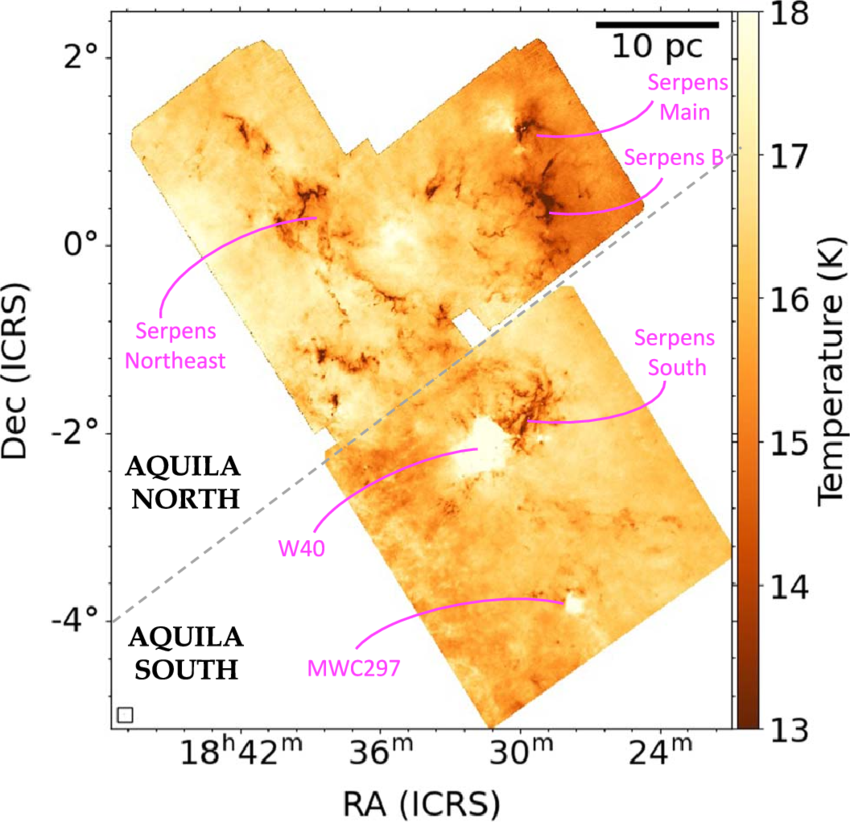
Aquila-Serpens rift north-south devide

Parallax measurements have been used to determine the distance to some of the stars clusters thought to be related to the Serpens-Aquila Rift. The distances to both W40 and Serpens-South were measured to be 436±9 pc (1420±30 light-years) using astrometric measurements of several cluster members observed with the Very Long Baseline Array (VLBA). For radio sources the Serpens Main star cluster, parallax measurements from the VLBA give a distance of 415±15 pc. The similarity in distance is consistent with the idea that these discrete star-forming regions are part of the same star-forming complex. Distances to molecular clouds and star-forming regions in the Milky Way Galaxy have, historically, been difficult to constrain. These VLBA measurements for W40, Serpens-South, and Serpens Main were among the most-accurate distance measurements for massive star-forming regions in the pre-Gaia era.

An earlier distance estimate to the cloud was found by counting the number of stars in front of the Serpens-Aquila Rift and using statistical models of the distribution of stars in the Galaxy. This method suggests that stars begin to be obscured by the clouds at a distance of 225±55 pc.

== Star formation ==
In the Serpens-Aquila Rift, the largest cluster of young stars is in the W40 nebula, which contains approximately 500 pre–main-sequence stars and the massive O-type star IRS 1A South. Serpens Main is another young cluster in which over 100 young stars have been discovered. Observations by the Spitzer Space Telescope revealed the Serpens south stellar nursery within a dense molecular filament. Class 0 protostars have been identified by millimeter radio observations of Westerhout 40 and Serpens South.

Serpens South is a star cluster embedded in a dense molecular filament containing numerous protostars. Due to the large number of protostars and pre-stellar cores in the region, it is likely that Serpens South has the most star-formation activity in the Serpens-Aquila Rift. A large scale magnetic field was discovered in the region which is perpendicular to the main cloud filament, but sub-filaments tend to run parallel to the filament. This magnetic field may be responsible for slowing the gravitational collapse of molecular clumps in the complex.

The Herschel Space Observatory has made a map of this region of the sky in mid- and far-infrared wavelengths. The molecular cloud at these wavelengths is traced by emission from warm dust in the clouds, allowing the structure of the clouds to be probed. Wavelet analysis of the molecular clouds in the approximately 11 square degree Herschel field of view breaks up the clouds into numerous filaments, mostly in and around the Westerhout 40 region. A number of possible "starless cores"—over-dense clumps of gas that may gravitationally collapse to form new stars—are also noted in this region, mostly studded along the molecular filaments. Millimeter observations from the IRAM 30m telescope provide confirmation for 46 of the starless-cores and Class 0/I protostars in the Westerhout 40 and Serpens south regions.

== In culture ==
The Aquila Rift was featured in the short story "Beyond the Aquila Rift" by Alastair Reynolds in the 2005 science-fiction anthology Constellations. The short story was adapted into a short film as part of Netflix's Love, Death & Robots compilation released in 2019.

== Gallery ==
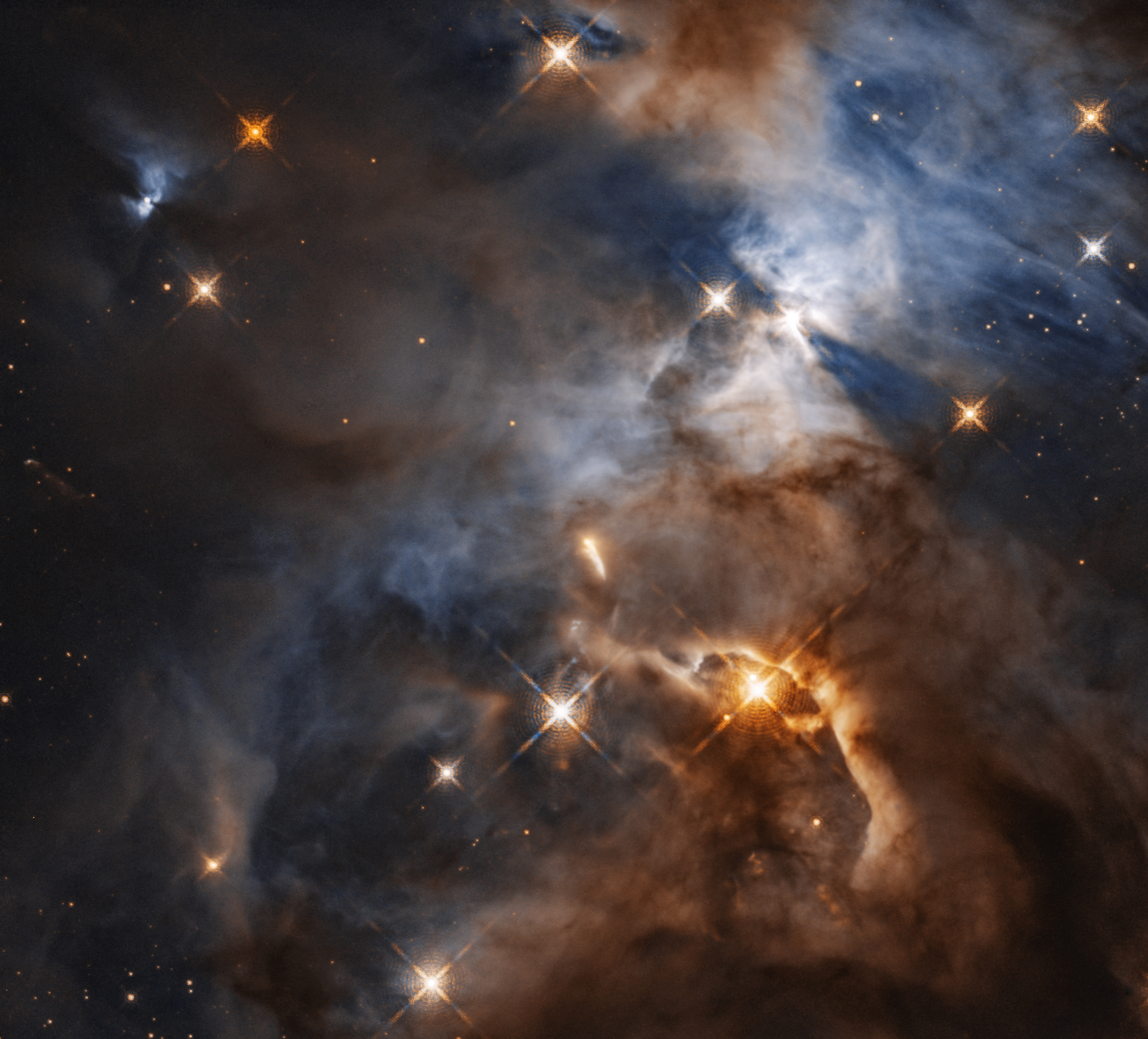
Serpens Main with Hubble. It also shows HBC 672, which is surrounded by a disk that casts a shadow on the surrounding nebula.

Serpens Main with JWST NIRCam

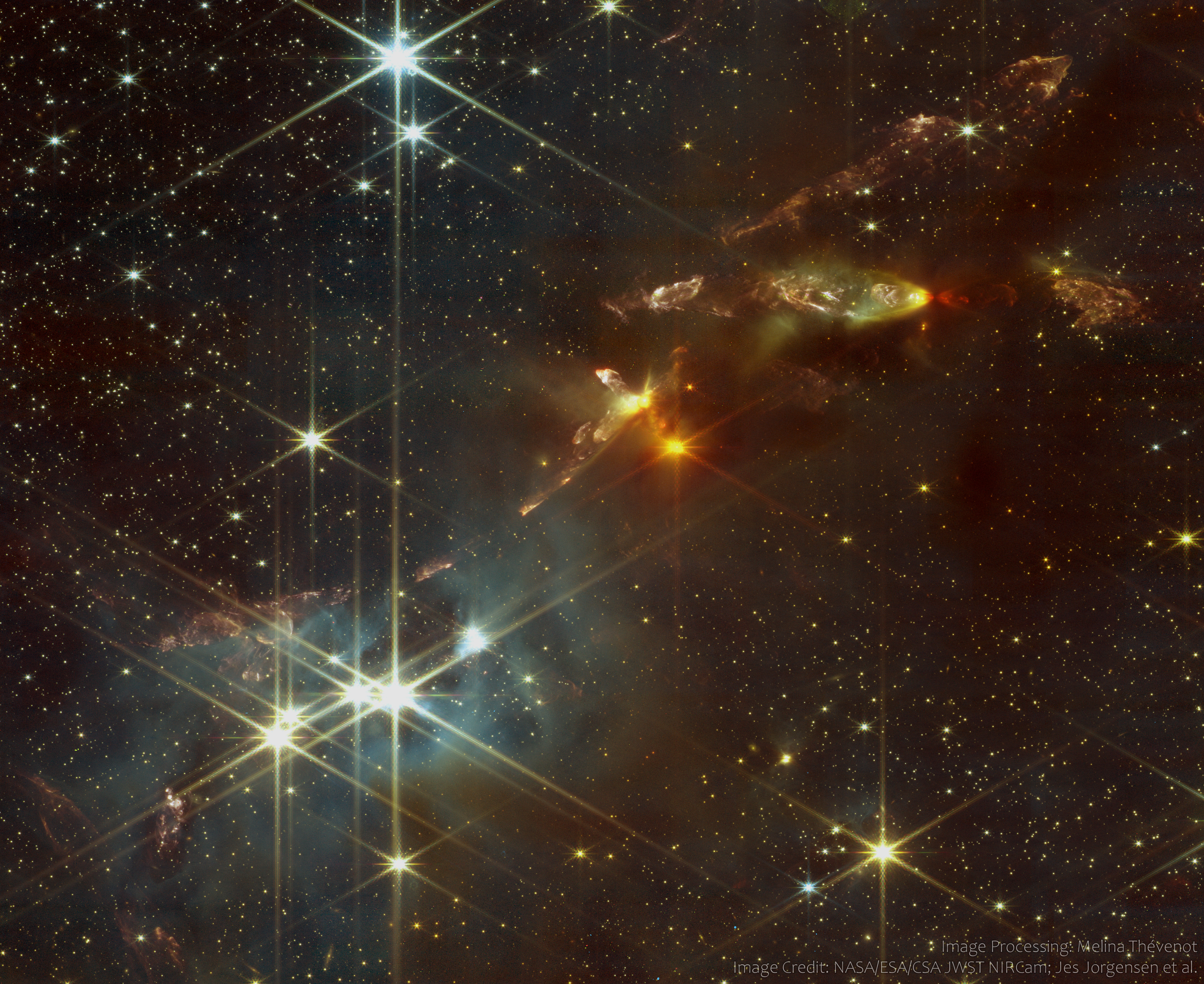
Serpens G3-G6 Cluster (aka Serpens B) with JWST NIRCam

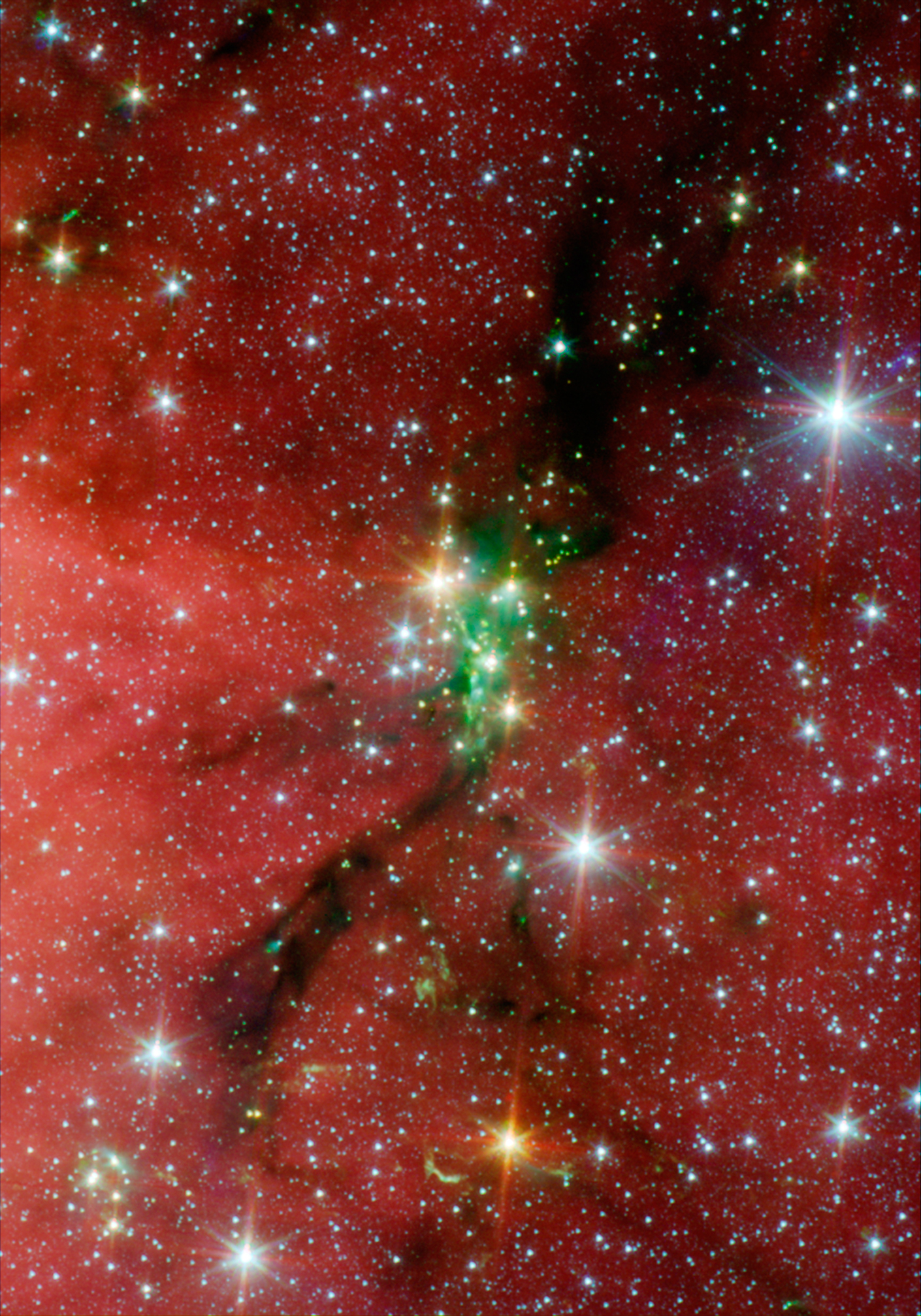
Serpens South with Spitzer

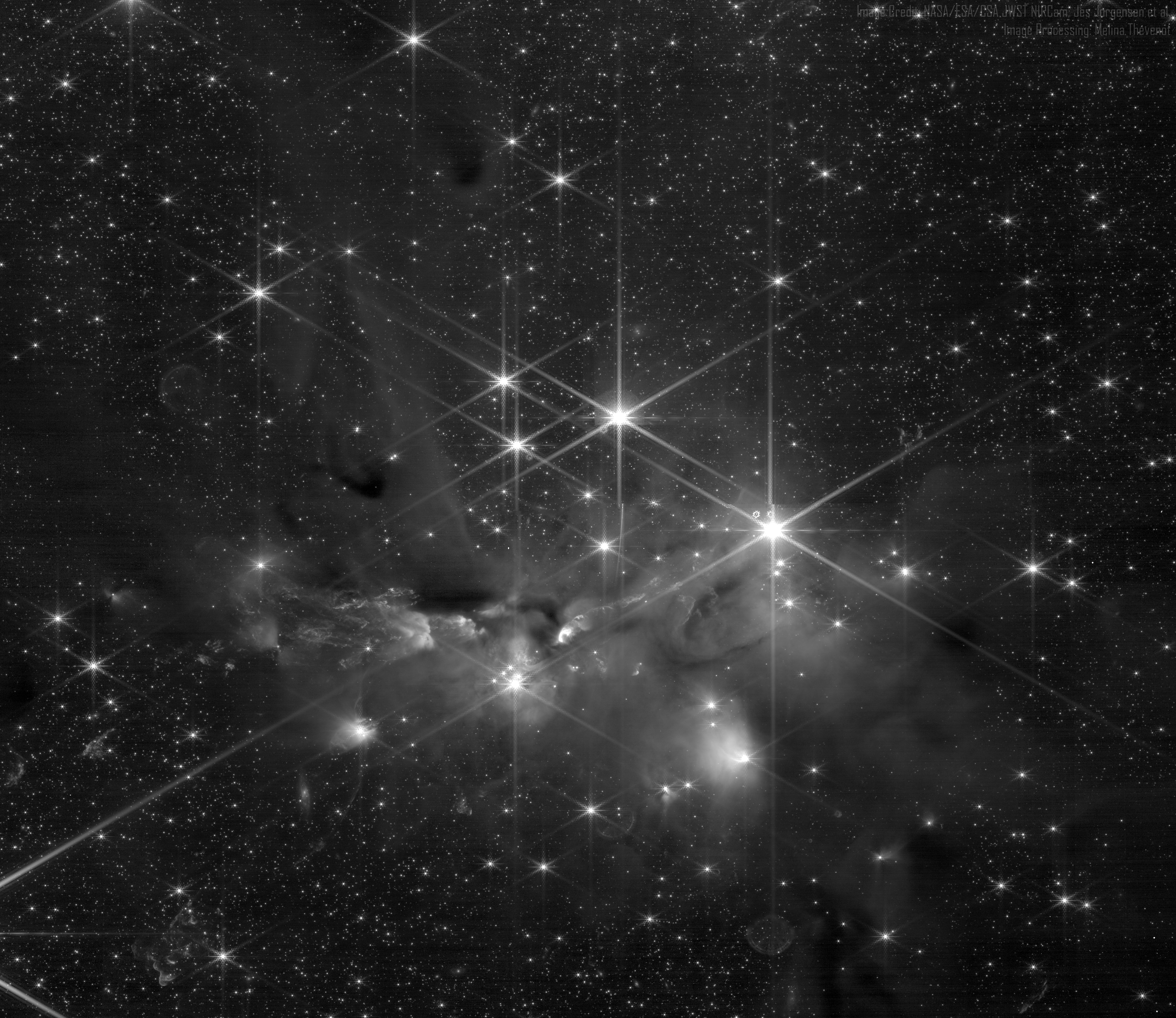
Serpens South with JWST NIRCam

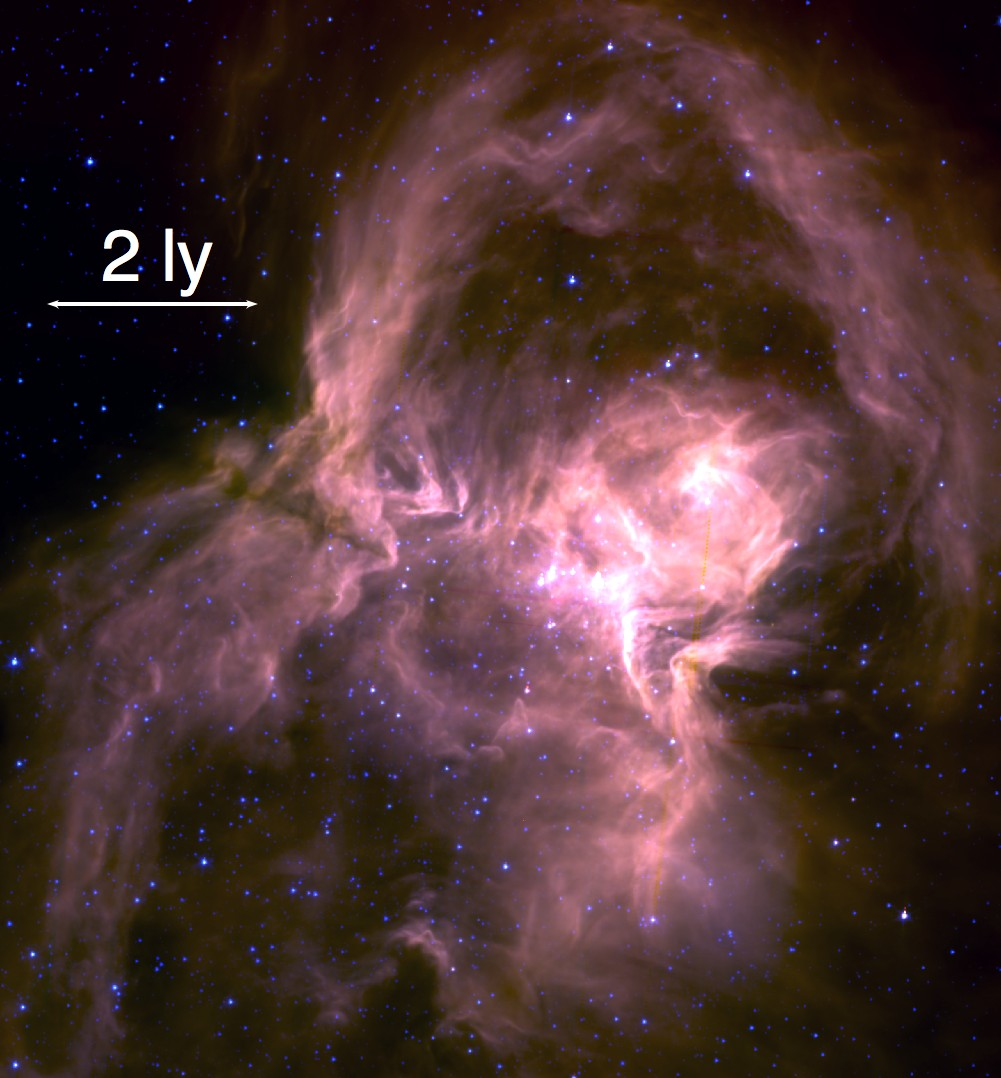
W40 with Spitzer

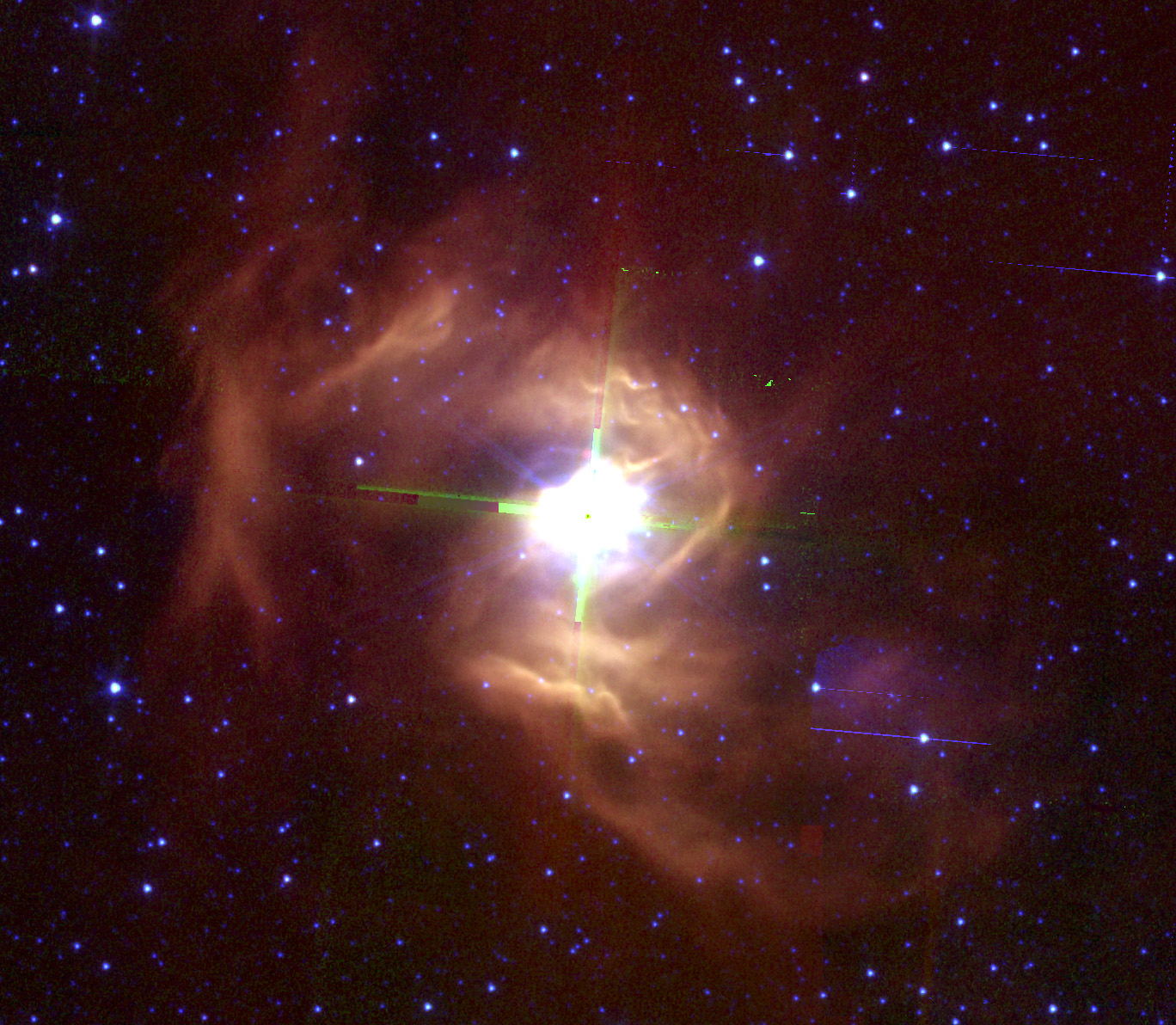
MWC 297 with Spitzer

== See also ==
- Great Rift (astronomy)
- Vela Molecular Ridge
- Rho Ophiuchi cloud complex
