= North America Nebula =

Emission nebula in the constellation Cygnus

Emission nebula
- H II region
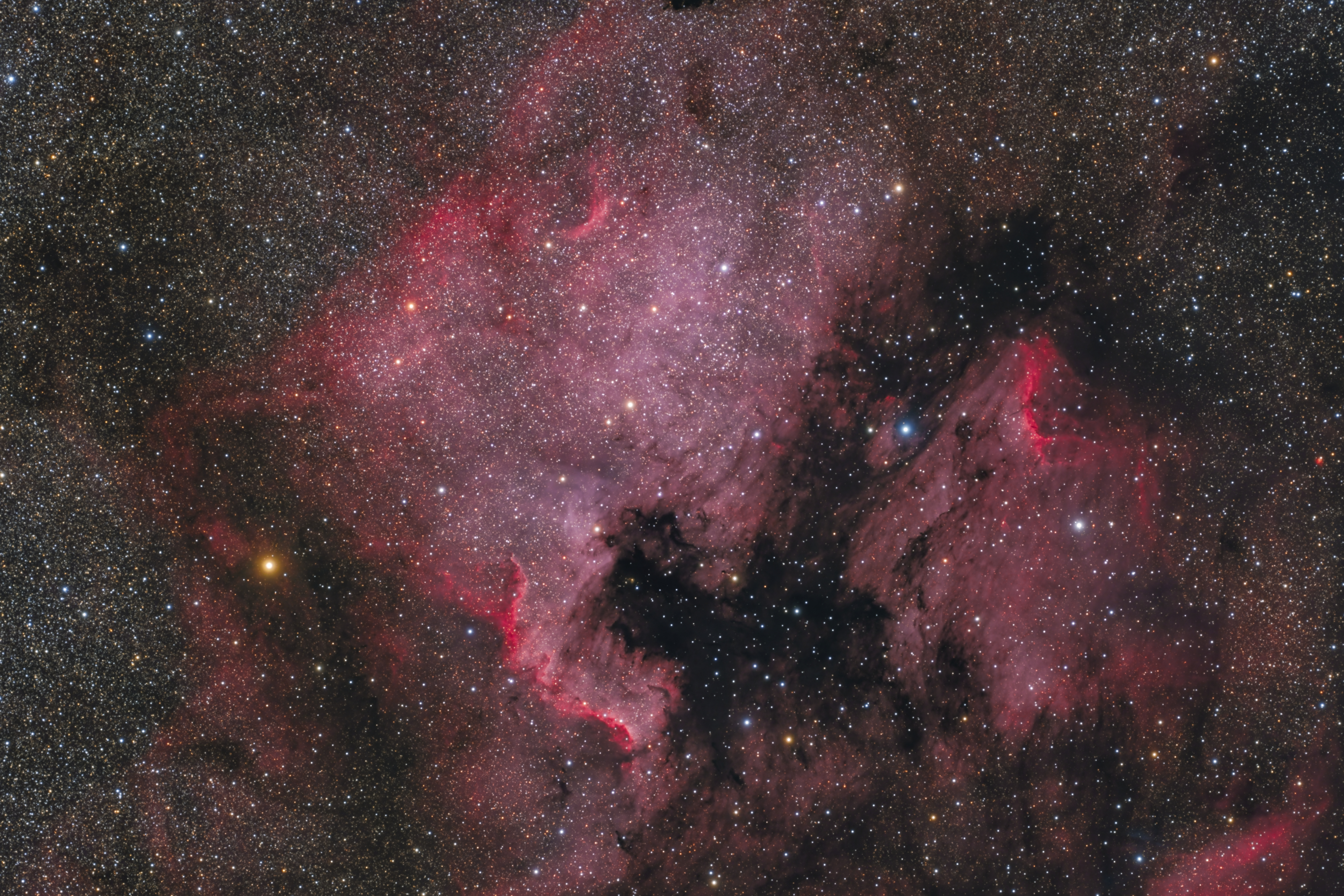
- The North America Nebula (left) and the Pelican Nebula (right), imaged by Giuseppe Donatiello

Observation data: J2000.0 epoch
- Right ascension: 20^{h} 59^{m} 17.1^{s}
- Declination: +44° 31′ 44″
- Distance: 2,590 ± 80 ly (795 ± 25 pc)
- Apparent magnitude (V): 4
- Apparent dimensions (V): 120 × 100 arcmin
- Constellation: Cygnus

Physical characteristics
- Radius: 45 ly
- Designations: NGC 7000, Sharpless 117, Caldwell 20

The North America Nebula (NGC 7000 or Caldwell 20) is an emission nebula in the constellation Cygnus, close to Deneb (the tail of the swan and its brightest star) in the night sky. It is named because its shape resembles North America.

== History ==
On October 24, 1786, William Herschel observing from Slough, England, noted a "faint milky nebulosity scattered over this space, in some places pretty bright." The most prominent region was catalogued by his son John Herschel on August 21, 1829. It was listed in the New General Catalogue as NGC 7000, where it is described as a "faint, most extremely large, diffuse nebulosity."

In 1890, the pioneering German astrophotographer Max Wolf noticed this nebula's characteristic shape on a long-exposure photograph, and dubbed it the North America Nebula.

In his study of nebulae on the Palomar Sky Survey plates in 1959, American astronomer Stewart Sharpless realised that the North America Nebula is part of the same interstellar cloud of ionized hydrogen (H II region) as the Pelican Nebula, separated by a dark band of dust, and listed the two nebulae together in his second list of 313 bright nebulae as Sh 2-117. American astronomer Beverly T. Lynds catalogued the obscuring dust cloud as L935 in her 1962 compilation of dark nebulae. Dutch radio astronomer Gart Westerhout detected the H II region Sh 2-117 as a strong radio emitter, 3° across, and it appears as W80 in his 1958 catalogue of radio sources in the band of the Milky Way.

== General information ==
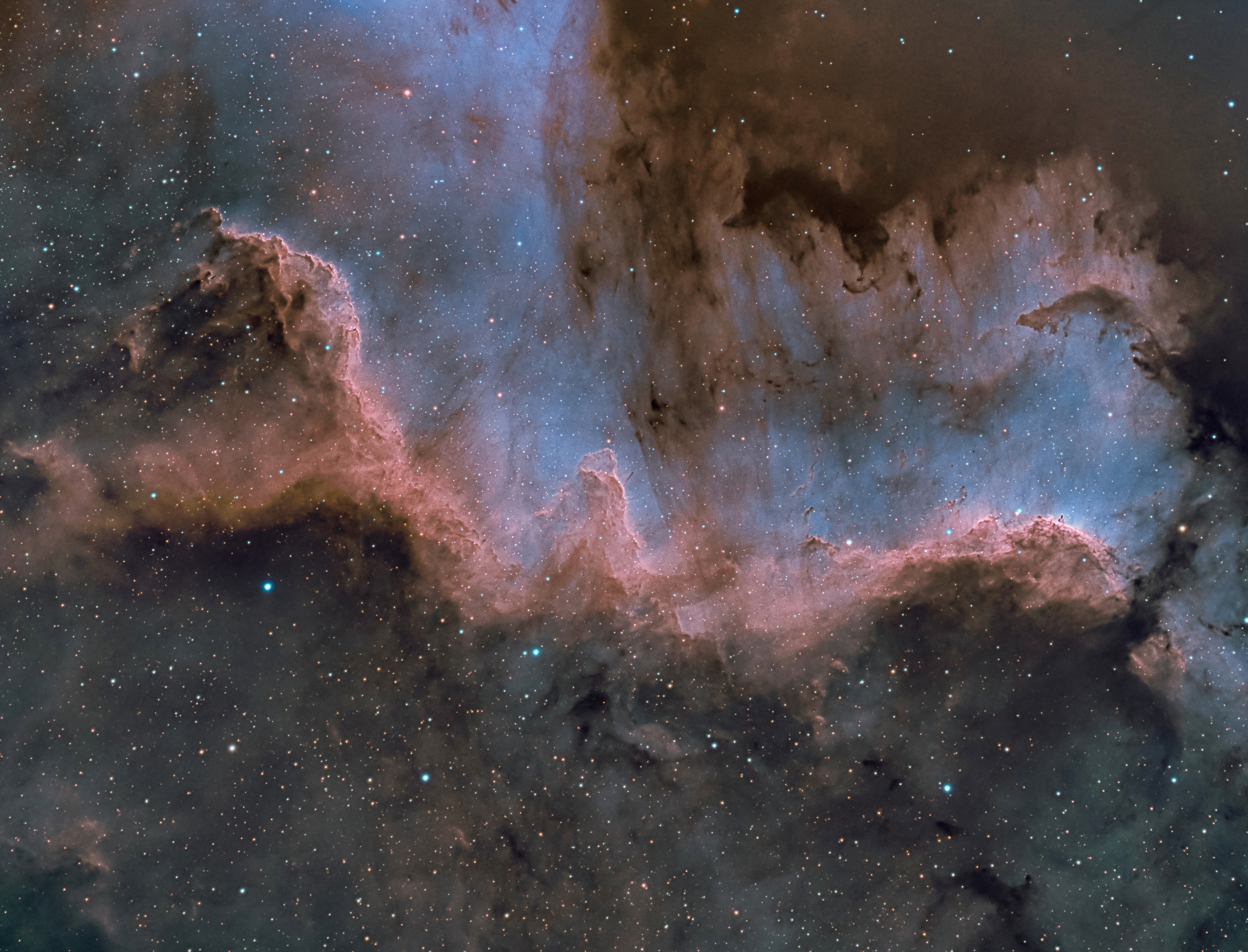
Enhanced view of the "Mexico and Central America" Cygnus Wall of the North America Nebula

The North America Nebula covers a region more than ten times the area of the full moon, but its surface brightness is low, so normally it cannot be seen with the unaided eye. Binoculars and telescopes with large fields of view (approximately 3°) will show it as a foggy patch of light under sufficiently dark skies. However, using a UHC filter, which filters out some unwanted wavelengths of light, it can be seen without magnification under dark skies. Its shape and reddish color (from the hydrogen Hα emission line) show up only in photographs of the area.

The portion of the nebula resembling Mexico and Central America is known as the Cygnus Wall. This region exhibits the most concentrated star formation.

At optical wavelengths, the North America Nebula and the Pelican Nebula (IC 5070) appear distinct as they are separated by the silhouette of the dark band of interstellar dust L935. The dark cloud is however transparent to radio waves and infrared radiation, and these wavelengths reveal the central regions of Sh 2-117 that are not visible to an ordinary telescope, including many highly luminous stars. The dark cloud L935 is sometimes called the "Gulf of Mexico".

== Distance and size ==
The distances to the North America and Pelican nebulae were controversial, because there are few precise methods for determining how far away an H II region lies. Until 2020, most astronomers accepted a value of 2,000 light years, though estimates ranged from 1,500 to 3,000 light years. But in 2020, the Gaia astrometry spacecraft measured the distances to 395 stars lying within the H II region, giving the North America and Pelican nebulae a distance of 2,590 light years (795±25 parsecs). The entire H II region Sh 2-117 is estimated to be 140 light years across, and the North America nebula stretches 90 light years north to south.

== Ionising star ==
H II regions shine because their hydrogen gas is ionised by the ultraviolet radiation from a hot star. In 1922, Edwin Hubble proposed that Deneb may be responsible for lighting up the North America Nebula, but it soon became apparent that it is not hot enough: Deneb has a surface temperature of 8,500 K, while the nebula's spectrum shows it is being heated by a star hotter than 30,000 K. In addition, Deneb is well away from the middle of the complete North America/Pelican Nebula complex (Sh 2-117), and by 1958 George Herbig realised that the ionizing star had to lie behind the central dark cloud L935. In 2004, European astronomers Fernando Comerón and Anna Pasquali searched for the ionizing star behind L935 at infrared wavelengths, using data from the 2MASS survey, and then made detailed observations of likely suspects with the 2.2 m telescope at the Calar Alto Observatory in Spain. One star, catalogued J205551.3+435225, fulfilled all the criteria. Lying right in the centre of Sh 2-117, with a temperature of over 40,000 K, it is almost certainly the ionising star for the North America and Pelican nebulae.

Later observations have revealed that this is a spectral type O3.5 star, with another hot star (type O8) in orbit. It lies just off the "Florida coast" of the North America Nebula, so it has been more conveniently named the Bajamar Star ("Islas de Bajamar," meaning "low-tide islands" in Spanish, was the original name of the Bahamas because many of them are only easily seen from a ship during low tide).

Although the light from the Bajamar Star is dimmed by 9.6 magnitudes (almost 10,000 times) by the dark cloud L935, it is faintly visible at optical wavelengths, at magnitude 13.2. If we saw this star undimmed, it would shine at magnitude 3.6, almost as bright as Albireo, the star marking the swan's head.

The Bajamar Star and another O-type star in the region, HD 199579 (the Toronto star), are both escaping from a group of stars dubbed the Bermuda cluster, following the same geographical nomenclature. They appear to have been ejected from the cluster around 1.5 million years ago.

== See also ==
- Pelican Nebula
- Cygnus Molecular Nebula Complex
