= NGC 274 =

Galaxy in the constellation Cetus

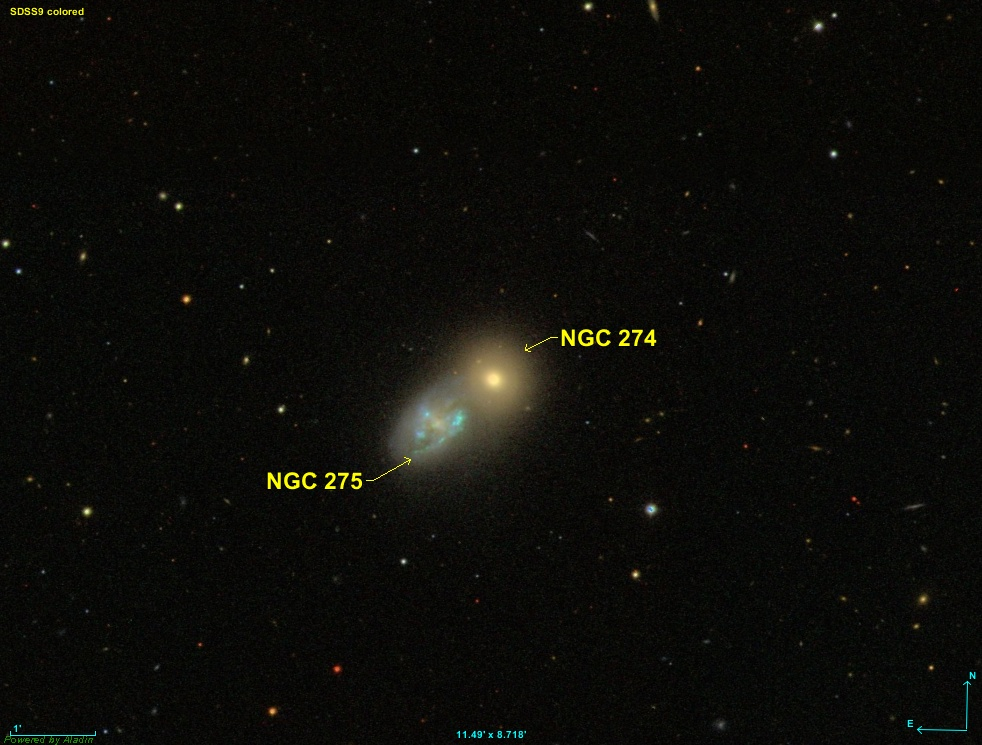
- NGC 274 with its companion, NGC 275 (image taken by SDSS)

Observation data (J2000 epoch)
- Constellation: Cetus
- Right ascension: 00^{h} 51^{m} 01.8^{s}
- Declination: −07° 03′ 25″
- Redshift: 0.005837
- Apparent magnitude (V): 12.80

Characteristics
- Type: S0
- Apparent size (V): 1.5' × 1.5'

Other designations
- MCG-01-03-021, Arp 140, PGC 2980.

NGC 274 is a lenticular galaxy in the constellation Cetus. It is a pair of galaxies, the other being NGC 275, which it is currently interacting with. It was discovered on September 10, 1785 by William Herschel. It is roughly 120 million light-years away.

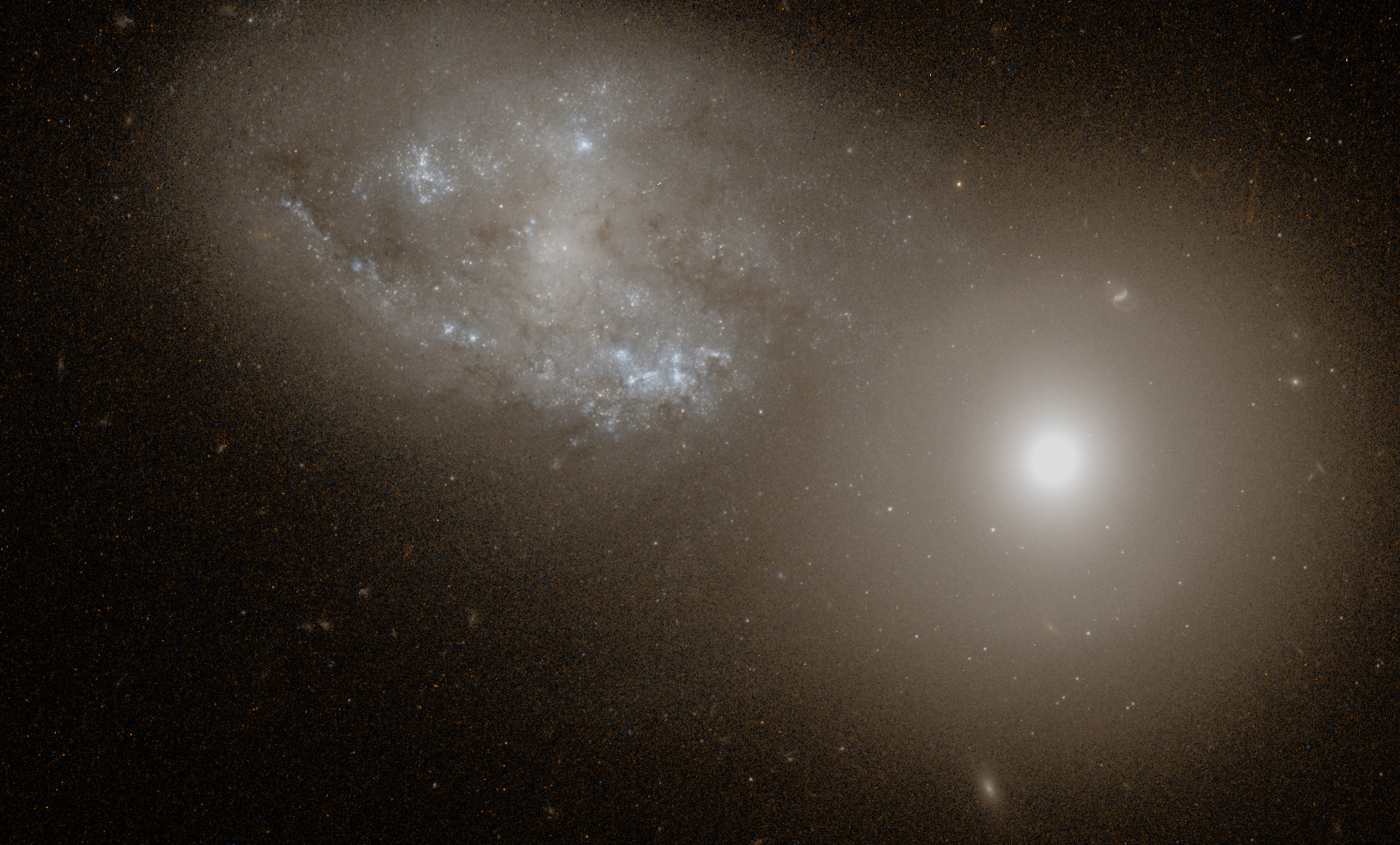
NGC 274 and NGC 275 with Hubble Wide Field Camera 3

== NGC 337 Group ==
NGC 274 is a member of the NGC 337 Group (also known as LGG 15). The group includes at least three other galaxies: NGC 275, NGC 298, and NGC 337.

== Supernova ==
One supernova has been observed in NGC 274: AT 2018cdc (Type II, mag. 16.9) was discovered by the Distance Less Than 40 Mpc Survey (DLT40) on 1 June 2018.
