= NGC 4312 =

Galaxy in the constellation Coma Berenices

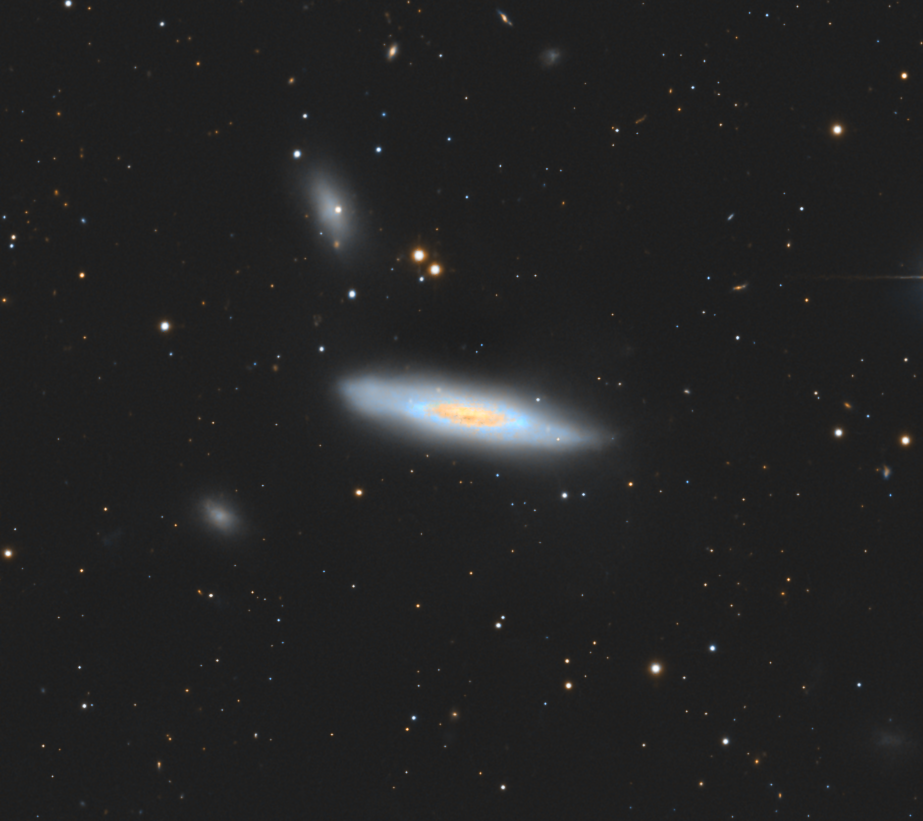
- This is galaxy NGC 4312 captured with an amateur telescope in 2025. It's in close proximity to Messier 100 in the Virgo Cluster.

Observation data (J2000 epoch)
- Constellation: Coma Berenices
- Right ascension: 12^{h} 22^{m} 31.3^{s}
- Declination: 15° 32′ 17″
- Redshift: 0.000510
- Heliocentric radial velocity: 153 km/s
- Distance: 55 Mly (17 Mpc)
- Group or cluster: Virgo Cluster
- Apparent magnitude (V): 12.53

Characteristics
- Type: SA(rs)ab
- Size: ~59,000 ly (18 kpc) (estimated)
- Apparent size (V): 4.6 x 1.1

Other designations
- UGC 07442, VCC 0559, PGC 040095, MCG +03-32-014

NGC 4312 is an edge-on unbarred spiral galaxy located about 55 million light-years away in the constellation Coma Berenices. It was discovered by astronomer William Herschel on January 14, 1787. NGC 4312 is a member of the Virgo Cluster and is a LINER galaxy.

It has undergone ram-pressure stripping in the past.

== Black Hole ==
NGC 4312 may harbor an intermediate-mass black hole with an estimated mass ranging from 10,000 (1*10^4) to 300,000 (3*10^5) solar masses.

== See also ==
- List of NGC objects (4001–5000)
