= Wide Field and Planetary Camera =

Former instrument on the Hubble Space Telescope

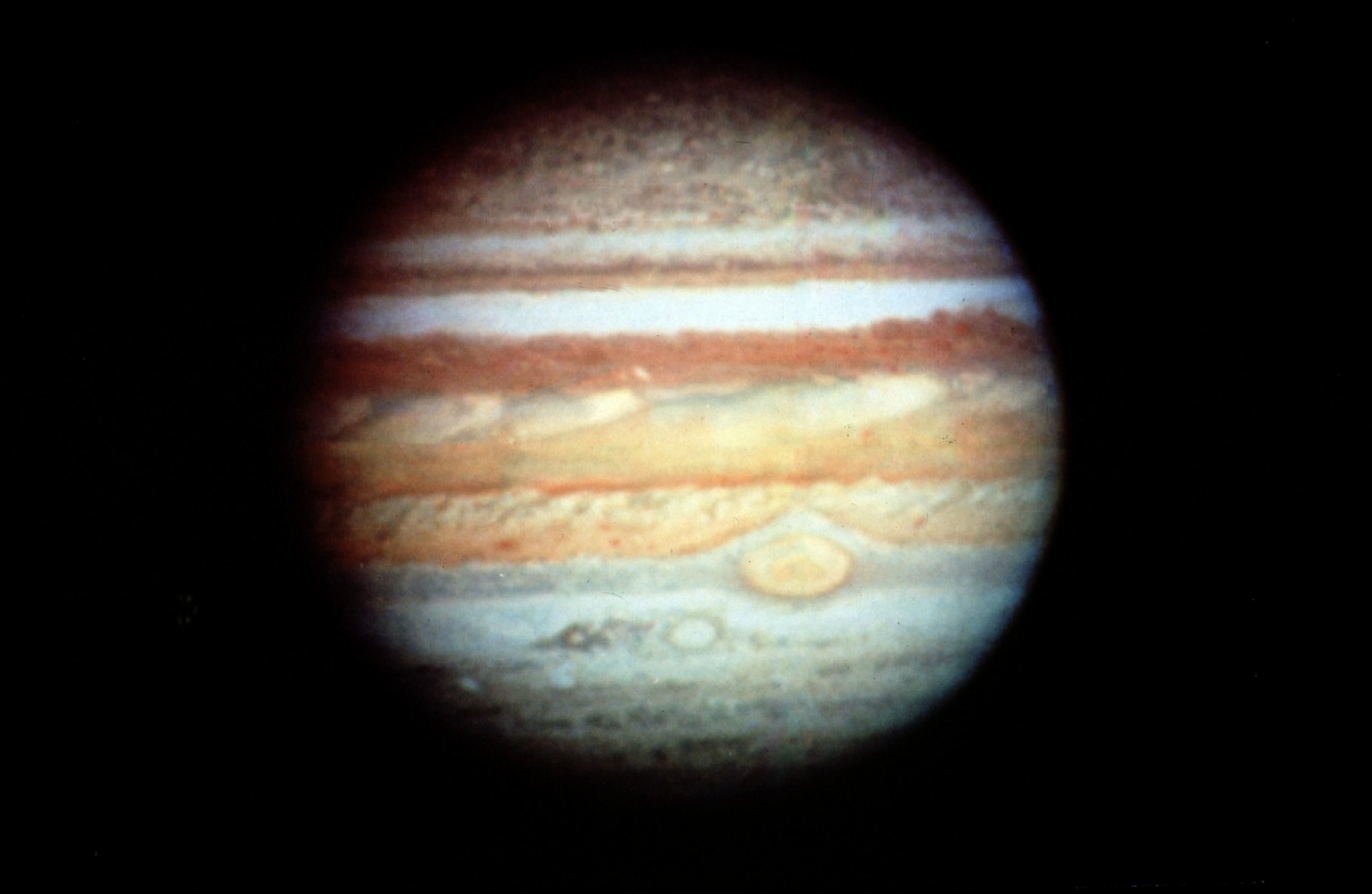
Wide Field and Planetary Camera view of Jupiter, 1991

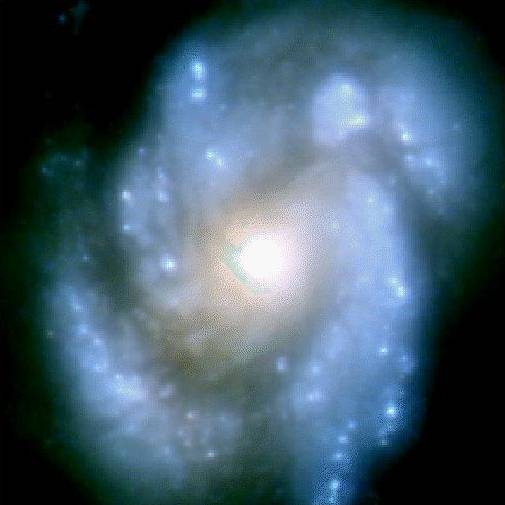
WFPC image of Messier 100 (NGC 4321)

The Wide Field/Planetary Camera (WFPC, pronounced as "wiffpick") was a camera installed on the Hubble Space Telescope launched in April 1990 and operated until December 1993. It was one of the instruments on Hubble at launch, but its functionality was severely impaired by the defects of the main mirror optics which afflicted the telescope. However, it produced uniquely valuable high resolution images of relatively bright astronomical objects, allowing for a number of discoveries to be made by HST even in its aberrated condition.

WFPC was proposed by James A. Westphal, a professor of planetary science at Caltech, and was designed, constructed, and managed by JPL. At the time it was proposed, 1976, CCDs had barely been used for astronomical imaging, though the first KH-11 KENNEN reconnaissance satellite equipped with CCDs for imaging was launched in December 1976. The high sensitivity offered such promise that many astronomers strongly argued that CCDs should be considered for Hubble Space Telescope instrumentation.

This first WFPC consisted of two separate cameras, each comprising four 800×800 pixel Texas Instruments CCDs arranged to cover a contiguous field of view. The Wide Field camera had a 0.1 arcsecond per pixel resolution and was intended for the panoramic observations of faint sources at the cost of angular resolution. The Planetary Camera had a 0.043 arcsecond per pixel resolution and was intended for high-resolution observations. Selection between the two cameras was done with a four-facetted pyramid that rotated by 45 degrees.

As part of the corrective service mission (STS-61 in December 1993) the WFPC was swapped out for a replacement version. The Wide Field and Planetary Camera 2 improved on its predecessor and incorporated corrective optics needed to overcome the main mirror defect. To avoid potential confusion, the WFPC is now most commonly referred to as WFPC1.

On its return to Earth, the WFPC was disassembled and parts of it were used in Wide Field Camera 3, which was installed in Hubble on May 14, 2009, as part of Servicing Mission 4, replacing WFPC2.

== Specifications ==
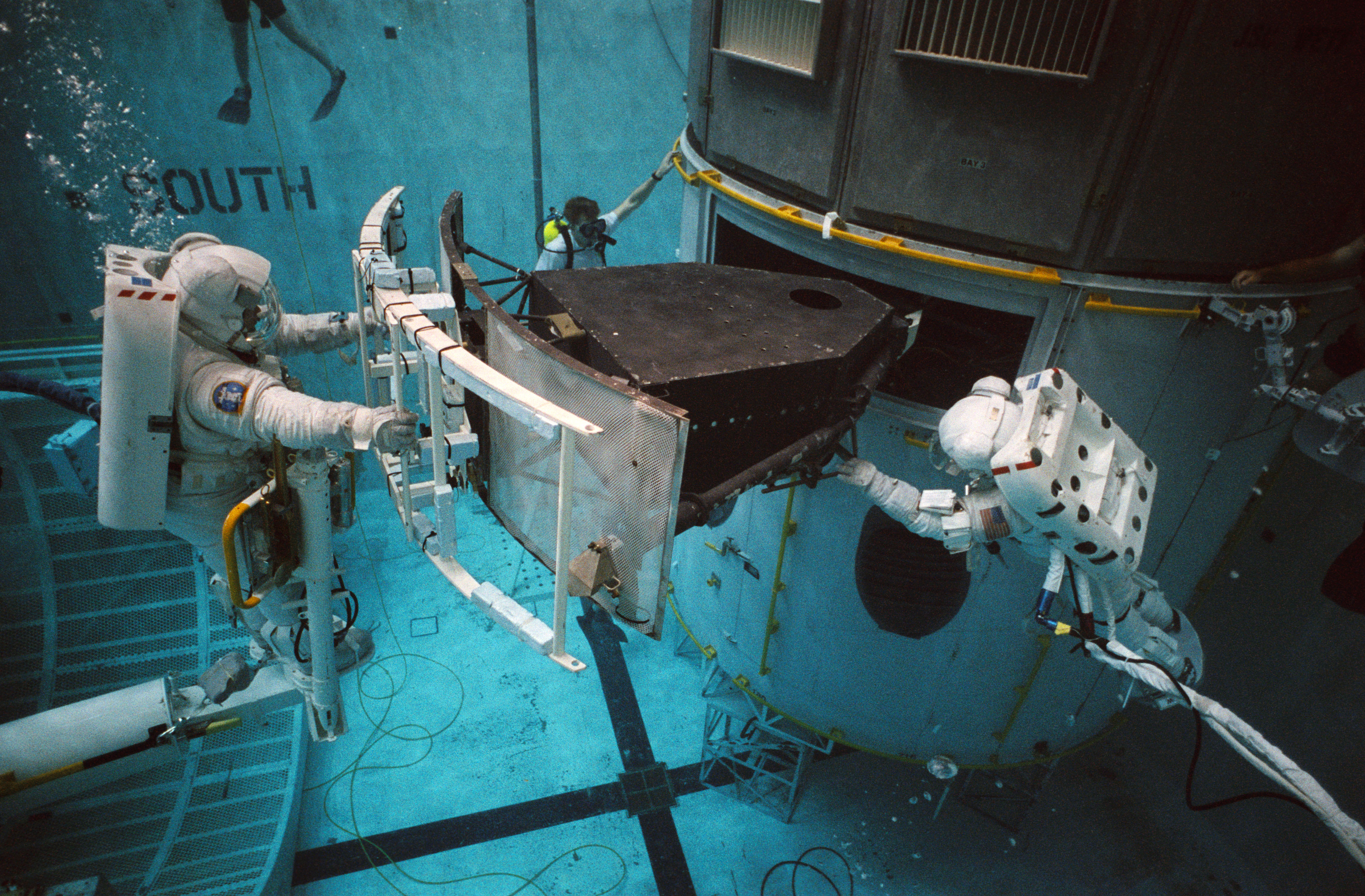
Astronauts practice replacing the WFPC on Earth in water tank to simulate working in space in 1993. The model being used is a full-scale training version of the WFPC

The instrument had two different cameras within, the Wide Field and the Planetary Camera. The Wide Field camera had a wider field of view compared to the Planetary Camera. Both cameras have a light wavelength detection range of 115 to 1000 nm.

=== Wide Field Camera ===
This instrument has a field of view of 2.6 x 2.6 arcminutes and an f-stop of f/12.9. It's equipped with 49 filters:

Wide Field Camera filter set
| Name | nm | | |
| Name | min | max | peak |
|---|---|---|---|
| F194W | 162.97 | 281.37 | 208.81 |
| F230W | 197.46 | 291.22 | 235.82 |
| F284W | 224.83 | 353.33 | 285.24 |
| F336W | 290.76 | 381.94 | 336.96 |
| F368M | 345.69 | 404.00 | 371.66 |
| F375N | 365.18 | 388.30 | 376.27 |
| F157W | 124.26 | 1024.19 | 294.68 |
| F413M | 387.07 | 440.16 | 412.76 |
| F437N | 433.12 | 439.58 | 436.67 |
| F439W | 392.84 | 479.18 | 435.36 |
| F469N | 464.69 | 472.53 | 468.71 |
| F487N | 482.35 | 491.12 | 486.99 |
| F492M | 457.64 | 527.34 | 490.63 |
| F502N | 497.38 | 506.10 | 501.85 |
| G450 | 318.83 | 673.03 | 488.17 |
| F517N | 506.25 | 528.86 | 516.99 |
| F122M | 115.02 | 1058.32 | 441.22 |
| F547M | 504.75 | 589.22 | 545.23 |
| G200 | 159.99 | 1049.96 | 482.07 |
| F555W | 444.24 | 712.01 | 540.00 |
| F569W | 482.20 | 705.66 | 558.06 |
| F588N | 581.08 | 594.40 | 587.98 |
| F606W | 452.50 | 737.56 | 580.36 |
| F622W | 532.31 | 751.58 | 611.44 |
| F631N | 625.44 | 635.04 | 630.62 |
| F648M | 609.05 | 690.78 | 646.34 |
| F656N | 652.73 | 658.47 | 655.83 |
| F658N | 654.54 | 660.20 | 657.71 |
| F664N | 647.01 | 680.26 | 664.01 |
| F673N | 662.51 | 680.21 | 672.26 |
| F675W | 592.30 | 772.69 | 666.27 |
| F8ND | 199.34 | 1068.46 | 567.85 |
| POL0 | 199.34 | 1068.46 | 567.85 |
| POL120 | 199.34 | 1068.46 | 567.85 |
| POL60 | 199.34 | 1068.46 | 567.85 |
| F128LP | 200.30 | 1068.57 | 570.52 |
| F702W | 583.31 | 895.14 | 683.13 |
| F718M | 662.88 | 786.74 | 714.82 |
| G800 | 555.11 | 1068.06 | 721.27 |
| F791W | 681.68 | 937.55 | 784.38 |
| F814W | 683.90 | 1013.82 | 803.42 |
| F875M | 821.62 | 944.75 | 875.49 |
| F889N | 881.31 | 896.43 | 888.92 |
| F725LP | 698.61 | 1078.80 | 838.40 |
| F785LP | 755.99 | 1083.60 | 887.16 |
| F850LP | 822.09 | 1084.32 | 928.94 |
| F1083N | 1071.00 | 1092.88 | 1082.98 |
| F1042M | 961.00 | 1094.67 | 1026.28 |

=== Planetary Camera ===
This instrument has a field of view of 66 x 66 arcseconds and an f-stop of f/30, corresponding to a smallest pixel scale of 0.043 arcsecond (unit of degree). It's equipped with 49 filters:

Planetary Camera filter set
| Name | nm | | |
| Name | min | max | peak |
|---|---|---|---|
| G200M2 | 114.6 | 197.5 | 155.5 |
| F194W | 162.8 | 284.6 | 207.8 |
| F230W | 194.8 | 295.0 | 236.2 |
| F284W | 228.2 | 363.7 | 289.2 |
| F336W | 291.3 | 382.2 | 339.0 |
| F368M | 345.8 | 404.0 | 371.8 |
| F375N | 365.2 | 388.3 | 376.3 |
| F413M | 387.1 | 440.3 | 413.0 |
| F437N | 433.1 | 439.6 | 436.7 |
| F439W | 393.1 | 479.3 | 436.8 |
| F469N | 464.7 | 472.5 | 468.7 |
| F487N | 482.4 | 491.1 | 487.0 |
| F492M | 457.8 | 527.4 | 491.0 |
| F502N | 497.4 | 506.1 | 501.9 |
| G450 | 321.6 | 673.2 | 494.1 |
| F517N | 506.3 | 528.9 | 517.0 |
| F157W | 125.1 | 1047.7 | 377.8 |
| F547M | 504.8 | 589.2 | 545.2 |
| F555W | 444.5 | 713.4 | 541.1 |
| F569W | 482.3 | 706.0 | 558.3 |
| F588N | 581.1 | 594.4 | 588.0 |
| G200 | 181.7 | 1054.8 | 514.4 |
| F606W | 452.9 | 737.9 | 581.6 |
| F622W | 532.3 | 752.4 | 611.9 |
| F122M | 117.6 | 1069.1 | 504.8 |
| F631N | 625.5 | 635.0 | 630.6 |
| F648M | 609.1 | 690.9 | 646.5 |
| F656N | 652.7 | 658.5 | 655.8 |
| F658N | 654.5 | 660.2 | 657.7 |
| F664N | 647.0 | 680.3 | 664.0 |
| F673N | 662.5 | 680.2 | 672.3 |
| F675W | 592.4 | 773.0 | 666.9 |
| F702W | 583.3 | 897.0 | 684.2 |
| F718M | 662.9 | 786.9 | 715.0 |
| F8ND | 213.2 | 1078.9 | 589.4 |
| POL0 | 213.2 | 1078.9 | 589.4 |
| POL120 | 213.2 | 1078.9 | 589.4 |
| POL60 | 213.2 | 1078.9 | 589.4 |
| F128LP | 214.5 | 1079.2 | 591.8 |
| G800 | 555.2 | 1077.0 | 725.9 |
| F791W | 681.7 | 938.8 | 785.0 |
| F814W | 684.0 | 1015.6 | 805.2 |
| F875M | 821.8 | 945.0 | 876.0 |
| F889N | 881.3 | 896.4 | 888.9 |
| F725LP | 698.7 | 1088.5 | 842.3 |
| F785LP | 756.1 | 1090.9 | 890.9 |
| F850LP | 822.4 | 1091.0 | 931.9 |
| F1083N | 1071.0 | 1092.9 | 1083.0 |
| F1042M | 962.3 | 1095.7 | 1028.9 |

== First light image ==
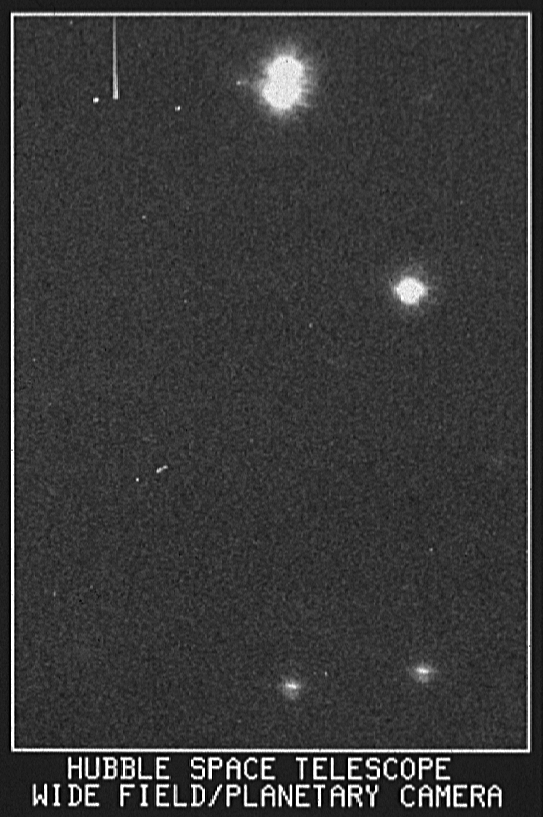
Here is the first light image for the Wide Field and Planetary Camera of HST, taken in May 1990; this view is near star HD96755 in the open cluster NGC 3532. This view is 11 by 14 arcseconds of the sky.

== Replacement ==
Although there was nothing known to be wrong with this instrument, the spherical aberration in HST's mirror severely limited the performance. WFPC was replaced by the Wide Field and Planetary Camera 2 which included its own internal corrective optics. WFPC2 was replaced by the Wide Field Camera 3 in 2009. After return to Earth, WFPC was disassembled and its parts cannibalized to make WFC3.

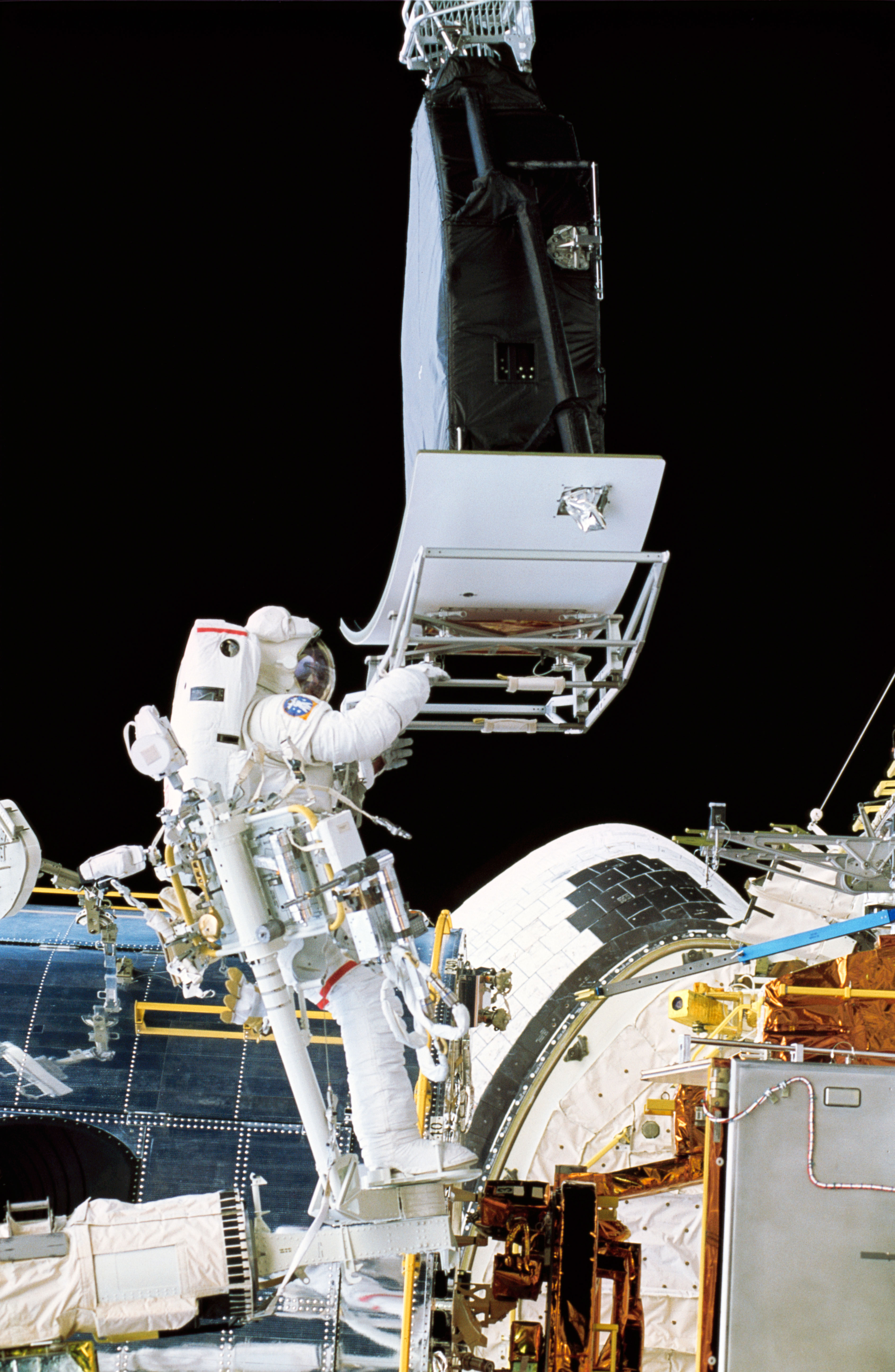
The Wide Field and Planetary Camera in space while it was being exchanged for Wide Field and Planetary Camera 2 during STS-61, 1993

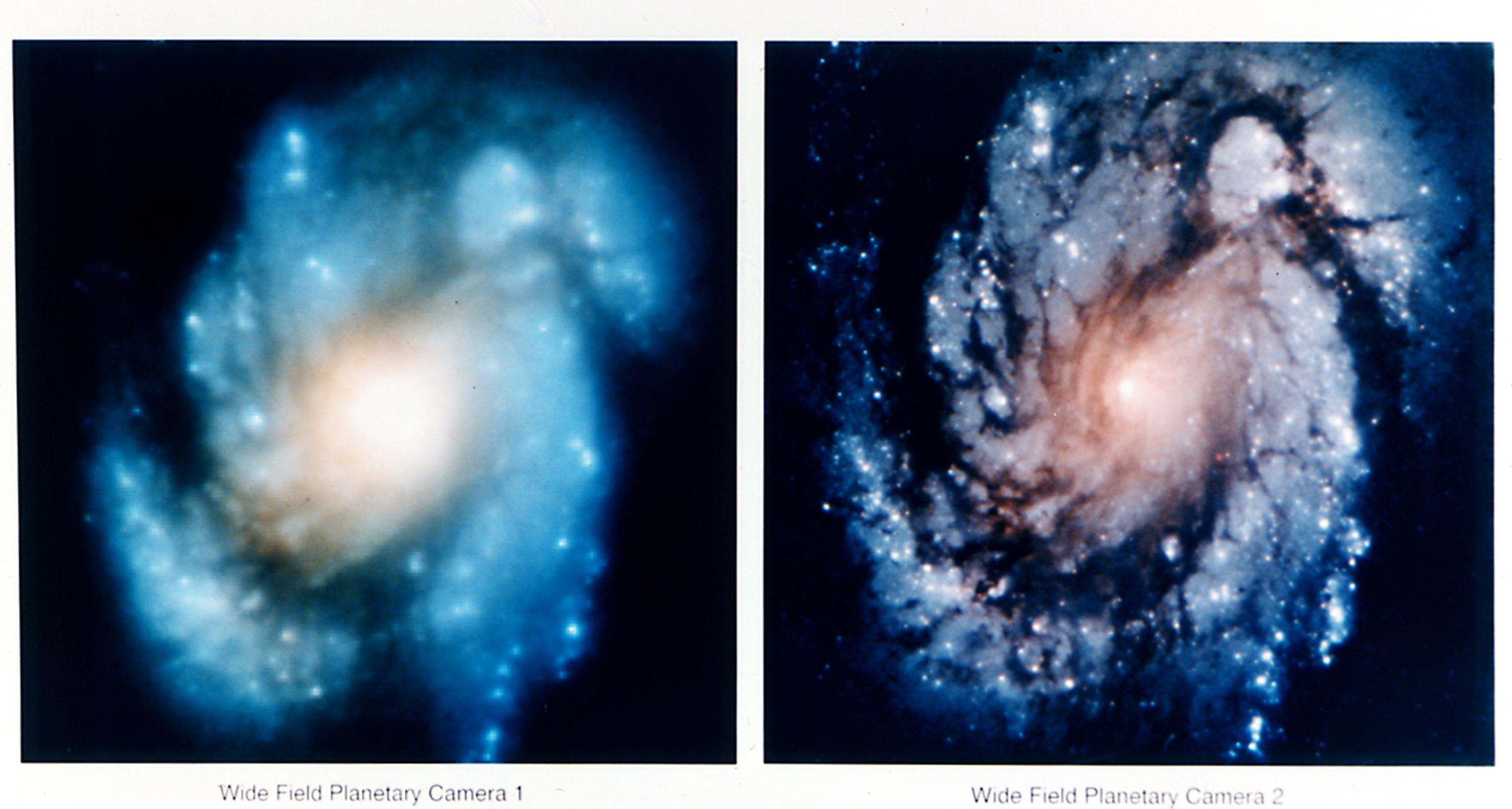
On the left, an un-corrected WFPC image of M100 in November 1993, next to an image by its replacement instrument with corrected optics

== See also ==
- Wide Field and Planetary Camera 2
- Wide Field Camera 3
- Advanced Camera for Surveys
- Cosmic Origins Spectrograph
- Faint Object Camera
- Faint Object Spectrograph
- Goddard High Resolution Spectrograph
- Near Infrared Camera and Multi-Object Spectrometer
- Space Telescope Imaging Spectrograph
