= NGC 298 =

Spiral galaxy in the constellation Cetus

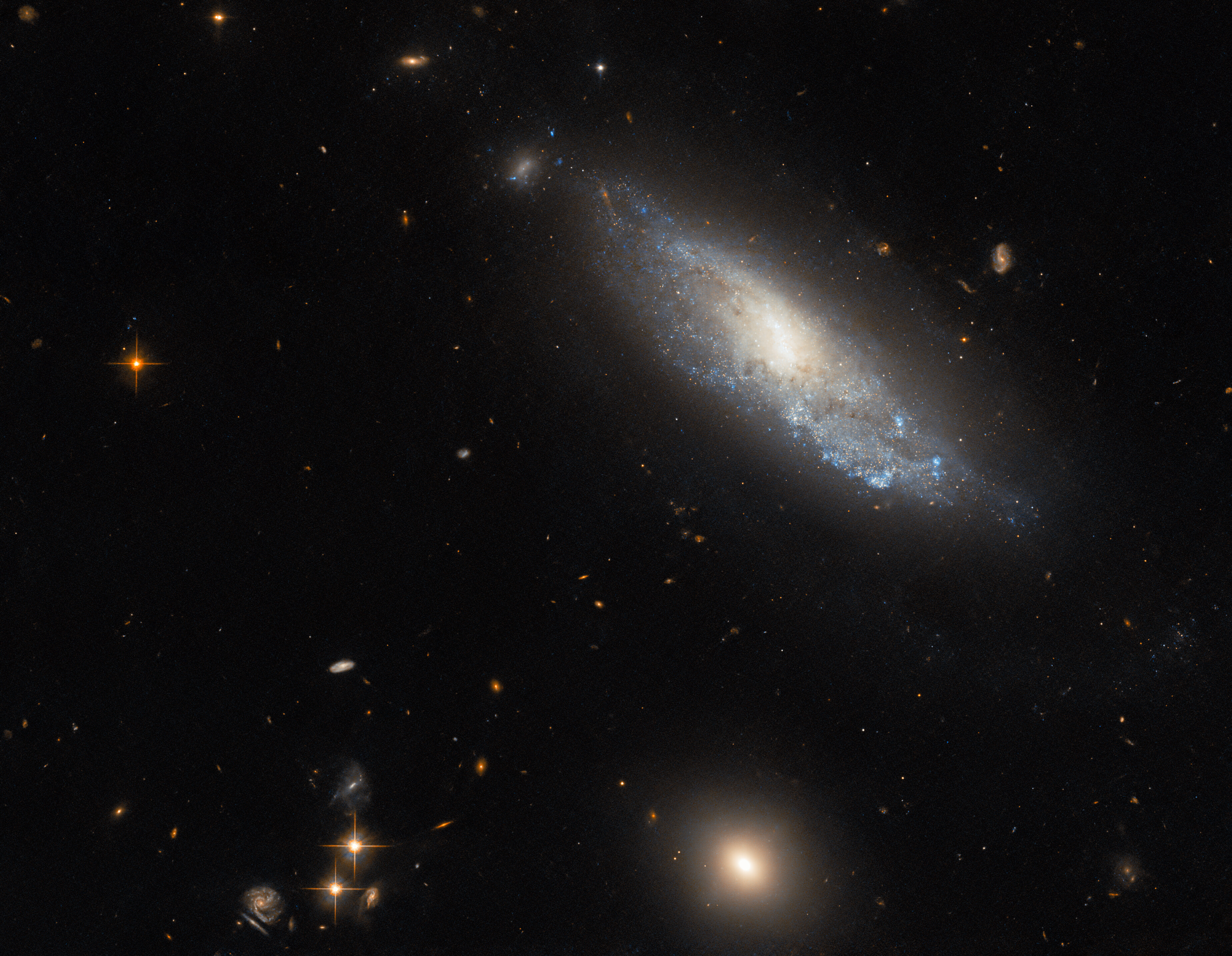
- NGC 298 with neighboring galaxy NGC 297, imaged by the Hubble Space Telescope

Observation data (J2000 epoch)
- Constellation: Cetus
- Right ascension: 00^{h} 55^{m} 02.3^{s}
- Declination: −07° 19′ 59″
- Redshift: 0.005847
- Heliocentric radial velocity: 1,753 km/s
- Apparent magnitude (V): 14.52

Characteristics
- Type: Scd
- Apparent size (V): 1.7' × 0.4'

Other designations
- MCG -01-03-033, 2MASX J00550234-0719591, IRAS F00525-0736, 6dF J0055024-071959, PGC 3055.

NGC 298 is a spiral galaxy in the constellation Cetus. It was discovered on September 27, 1864, by Albert Marth. NGC 298 is situated close to the celestial equator and, as such, it is at least partly visible from both hemispheres in certain times of the year. Given its B magnitude of 14.7, NGC 298 is visible with the help of a telescope having an aperture of 20 inches (500 millimetre) or more.

One supernova has been observed in NGC 298: SN 1986K (Type II, mag. 16.5) was discovered by Thomas Schildknecht on 1 September 1986.

It is part of a galaxy group known as LGG 15 or NGC 274 Group. It has at least 3 members, which are NGC 274, NGC 275 and NGC 337.
