= NGC 4328 =

Galaxy in the constellation Coma Berenices

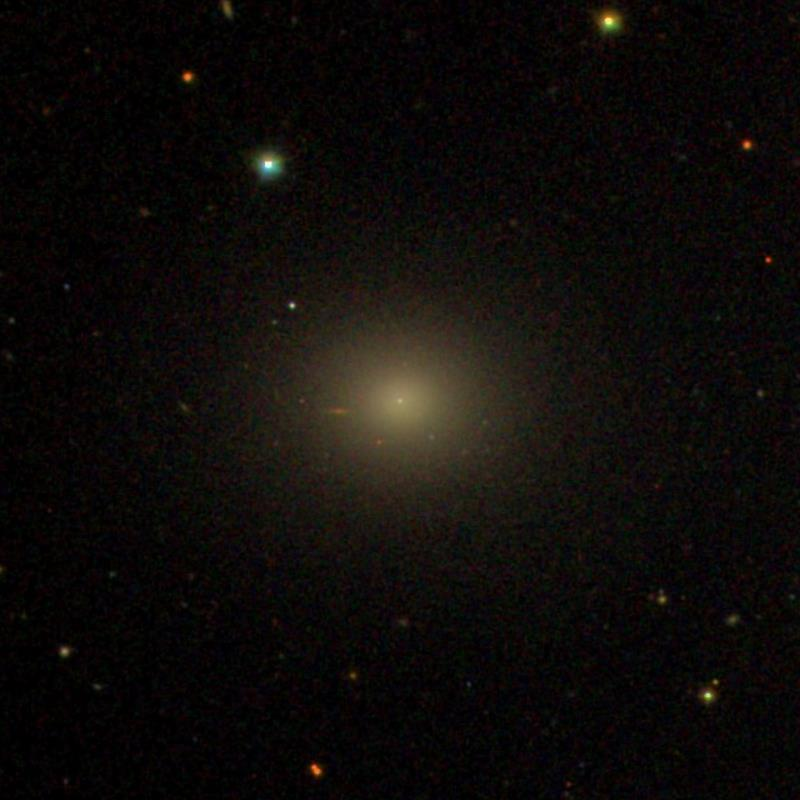
- SDSS image of NGC 4328.

Observation data (J2000 epoch)
- Constellation: Coma Berenices
- Right ascension: 12^{h} 23^{m} 20.0^{s}
- Declination: 15° 49′ 13″
- Redshift: 0.001616
- Heliocentric radial velocity: 484 km/s
- Distance: 48.4 Mly (14.84 Mpc)
- Group or cluster: Virgo Cluster (A subgroup)
- Apparent magnitude (V): 14.3

Characteristics
- Type: dE1 N, SA0-
- Mass: 2.7×10^{9} (Stellar mass)/5.6×10^{9} (Total Mass) M_{☉}
- Size: ~32,000 ly (9.81 kpc) (estimated)
- Apparent size (V): 1.22 × 0.98

Other designations
- PGC 040209, VCC 0634, MCG +03-32-019

NGC 4328 is a nucleated dwarf elliptical or lenticular galaxy located about 48 million light-years away based on observations by the Hubble Space Telescope using the TRGB distance indicator. NGC 4328 was discovered on March 21, 1784 by astronomer William Herschel and is a member of the Virgo Cluster in the "A'' subgroup. On the sky, NGC 4328 is located in the constellation Coma Berenices.

NGC 4328 is a companion of Messier 100, along with NGC 4323 and lies 78,000 light-years (24 kiloparsecs) from Messier 100. A possible passage of NGC 4328 close to Messier 100, may explain the lopsidedness in the southwestern portion of Messier 100. However, there are no strong signs of interactions in the H I distribution of Messier 100 which may be due to an interaction between the two galaxies. Despite this, recent observations are too shallow to detect tidal streams in the H I distribution of Messier 100 caused by a possible interaction between the two galaxies.

NGC 4328 is host to a supermassive black hole with an estimated mass of 6.1×10^{6} solar masses.

== See also ==
- List of NGC objects (4001–5000)
- NGC 4323
