= SN 1979C =

Supernova of 1979 in the constellation Coma Berenices

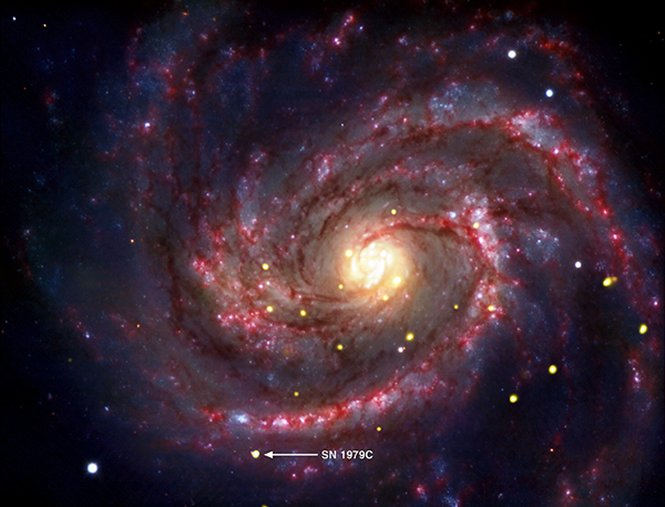
- Event type: Type II supernova
- Type II
- Date: 1979
- Constellation: Coma Berenices
- Right ascension: 12^{h} 22^{m} 58.58^{s}
- Declination: +15° 47′ 52.7″
- Epoch: J2000.0
- Galactic coordinates: G271.2454 +76.8848
- Distance: 50 Mly
- Remnant: ?
- Host: M100
- Progenitor: ?
- Progenitor type: ?
- Colour (B-V): ?
- Peak apparent magnitude: +12.23
- Other designations: SN 1979C, AAVSO 1217+16

SN 1979C was a supernova about 50 million light-years away in Messier 100, a spiral galaxy in the constellation Coma Berenices. The Type II supernova was discovered April 19, 1979 by Gus Johnson, a school teacher and amateur astronomer. This type of supernova is known as a core collapse and is the result of the internal collapse and violent explosion of a large star. A star must have at least 9 times the mass of the Sun in order to undergo this type of collapse. The star that resulted in this supernova was estimated to be in the range of 20 solar masses.

On November 15, 2010 NASA announced that evidence of a black hole had been detected as a remnant of the supernova explosion. Scientists led by Dr. Dan Patnaude from the Center for Astrophysics | Harvard & Smithsonian in Cambridge, MA evaluated data gathered between 1995 and 2007 from several space based observatories. NASA's Chandra X-ray Observatory, the Swift Gamma-Ray Burst Mission, as well as the European Space Agency's XMM-Newton, and Germany's ROSAT all participated in the examination.

The researchers observed a steady source of X-rays and determined that it was likely that this was material being fed into the object either from the supernova or a binary companion. However, an alternative explanation would be that the X-ray emissions could be from the pulsar wind nebula from a rapidly spinning pulsar, similar to the one in the center of the Crab Nebula. These two ideas account for several types of known X-ray sources. In the case of black holes the material that falls into the black hole emits the X-rays and not the black hole itself. Gas is heated by the fall into the strong gravitational field.

SN 1979C has also been studied in the radio frequency spectrum. A light curve study was performed between 1985 and 1990 using the Very Large Array radio telescope in New Mexico.

== See also ==
- History of supernova observation
- Messier object containing SN 1979C
