= SN 2020oi =

Extragalactic supernova in 2020

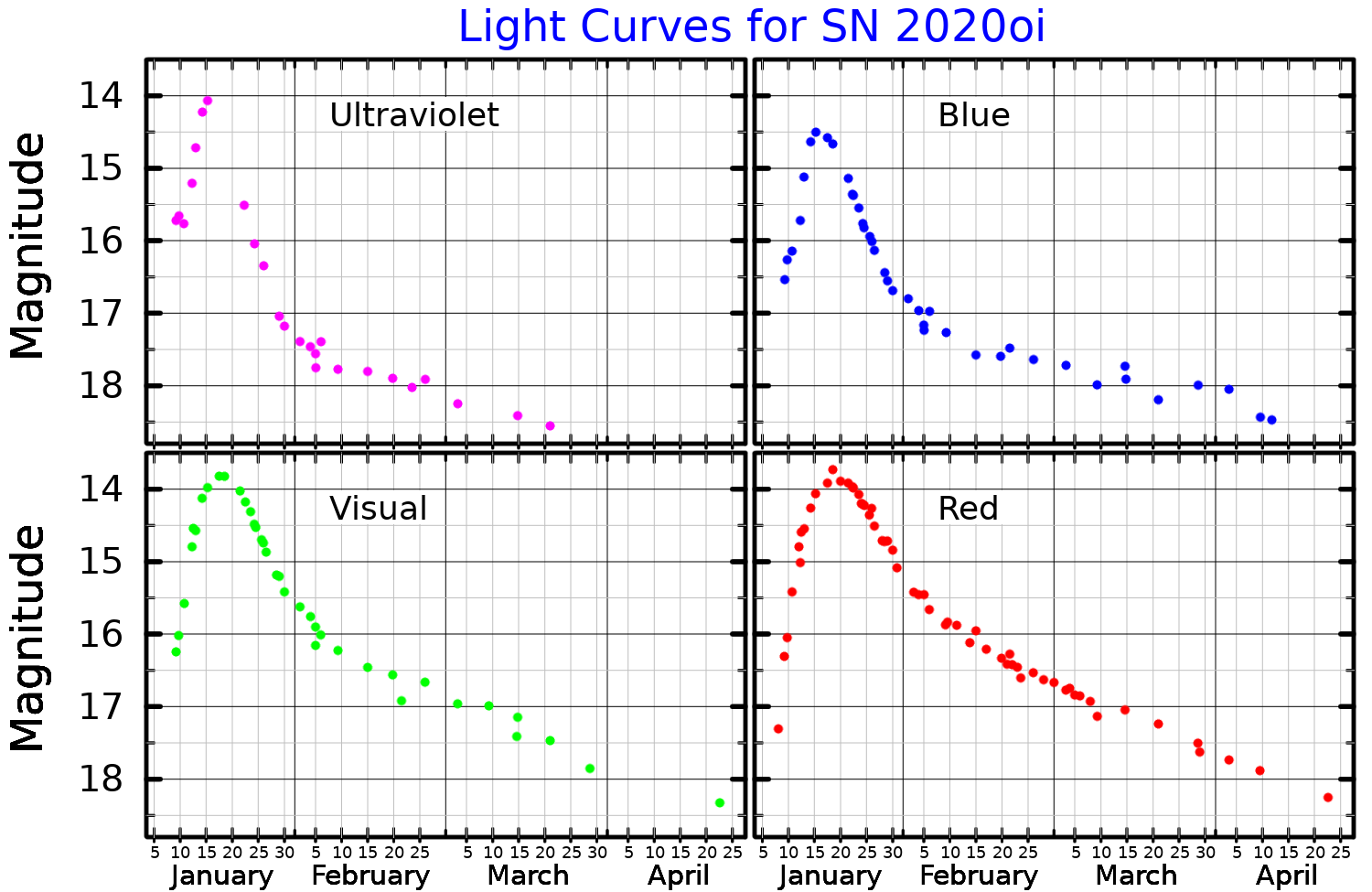
- 2020 light curves for SN 2020oi in four photometric bands, adapted from Rho et al. (2021)
- Event type: Supernova
- Type Ic
- Date: January 7, 2020
- Instrument: ZTF
- Constellation: Coma Berenices
- Right ascension: 12^{h} 22^{m} 54.925^{s}
- Declination: +15° 49′ 25.05″
- Epoch: J2000
- Distance: 46 Mly (14 Mpc)
- Redshift: 0.0052
- Host: Messier 100
- Progenitor type: Envelope-stripped massive star
- Peak apparent magnitude: 17.28
- Total energy output: ~10^{51} erg

SN 2020oi was a supernova event in the grand design spiral galaxy known as Messier 100, or NGC 4321. It was discovered January 7, 2020 at an apparent magnitude of 17.28 by F. Forster and associates using the Zwicky Transient Facility. The position places it ~4.67″ north of the galactic nucleus. The supernova was not detected on an observation made three days before the discovery, and thus it must have begun during that brief period. The light curve peaked around January 13–18, depending on the wavelength, then declined rapidly over a period of 25 days before flattening into a more gradual decline. Observations of the spectrum made with the SOAR telescope showed this to be a Type Ic supernova, with the progenitor being a massive star that had its outer envelope stripped. The initial velocity of the expanding photosphere was ~15,000 km/s.

Models of the event give an initial (zero age main sequence) estimated mass of 9.5±1.0 M_{☉} or 13 M_{☉} for the progenitor. It was a member of a binary star system and lost its outer envelope of hydrogen and helium due to interaction with its companion. The resulting helium-poor star was primarily made of carbon and oxygen with a mass of about 2.16 M_{☉}. The supernova explosion was the result of a collapse of an inert iron core. The event ejected 0.71 M_{☉} of material and left behind a neutron star remnant with a presumed mass of 1.45 M_{☉}. The explosion released about 10^{51} erg of energy, of which 60% was expended on kinetic energy.

This is one of the few Type Ic supernovae for which radio emission has been detected. Based on this data, the shock wave from the explosion advanced through the surrounding interstellar matter with a velocity of 3−4×10^{4} km/s. In order to produce the observed emission, the progenitor star underwent mass loss at an average rate of 1.4×10^{−4} M_{☉}·yr^{−1} at a typical wind velocity of ~1,000 km/s. Images of the location taken prior to the event using the Hubble Space Telescope show a stellar cluster at that location.
