= NGC 275 =

Galaxy located in the constellation Cetus

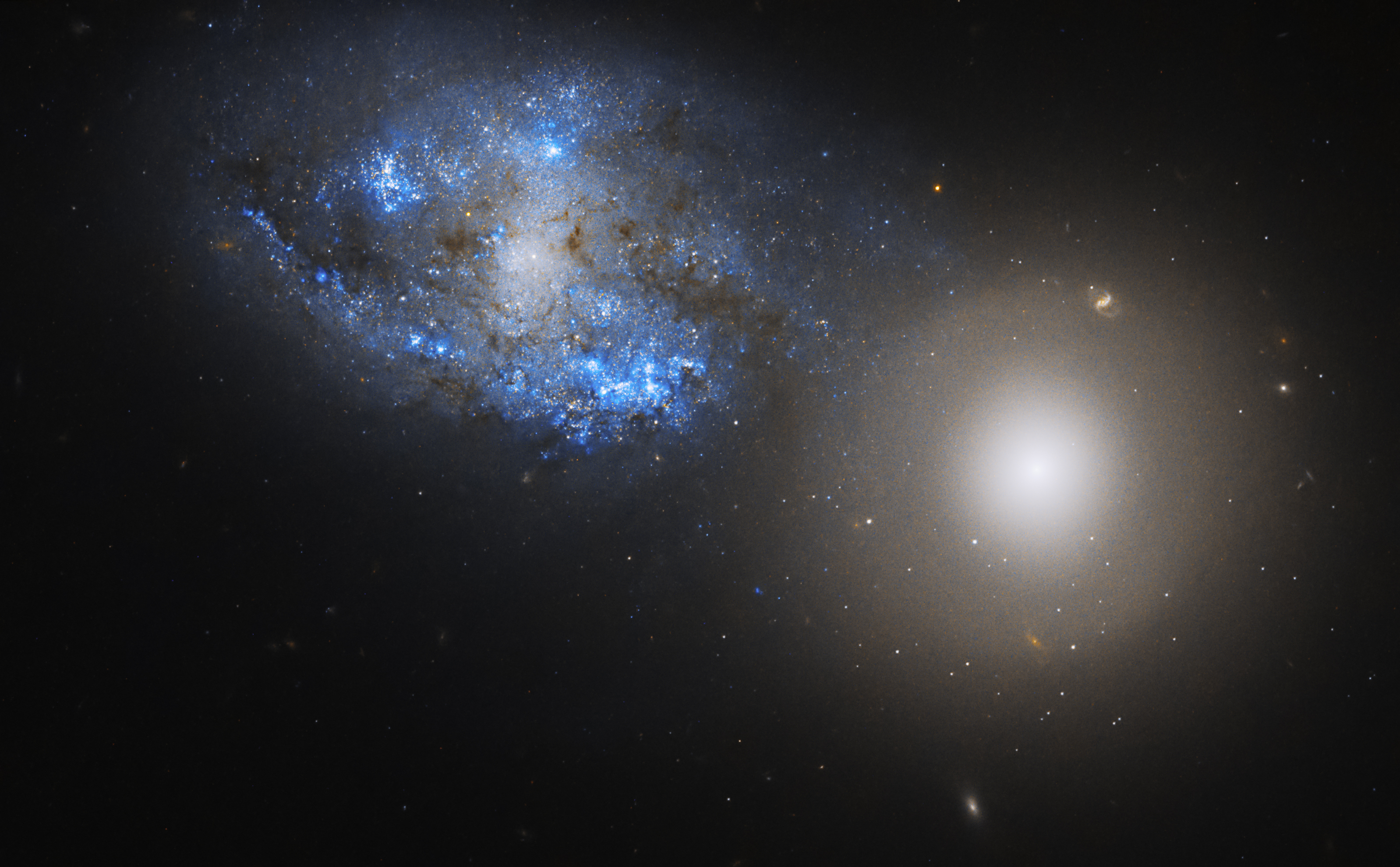
- NGC 275 (left) with NGC 274 (right) (image taken by Hubble Space Telescope)

Observation data (J2000 epoch)
- Constellation: Cetus
- Right ascension: 00^{h} 51^{m} 04.2^{s}
- Declination: −07° 04′ 00″
- Redshift: 0.005817
- Distance: 63 Mly
- Apparent magnitude (V): 13.16

Characteristics
- Type: SBcd
- Apparent size (V): 1.5' × 1.1'
- Notable features: Interacting with NGC 274

Other designations
- MCG -01-03-022, PGC 2984, GC 157, h 70, IRAS 00485-0720.

NGC 275 is a barred spiral galaxy located approximately 63 million light-years from the Solar System in the constellation Cetus. It is one of a pair of galaxies, the other being NGC 274. It was discovered on October 9, 1828, by John Herschel.

The galaxy was described as "very faint, small, round, southeastern of 2" by John Dreyer in the New General Catalogue, with the other of the two galaxies being NGC 274.

NGC 275 is part of a galaxy group known as LGG 15 or NGC 274 Group. It has at least 3 members, which are NGC 274, NGC 298 and NGC 337.

== See also ==
- Spiral galaxy
- List of NGC objects (1–1000)
