= NGC 337 =

Galaxy in the constellation Cetus

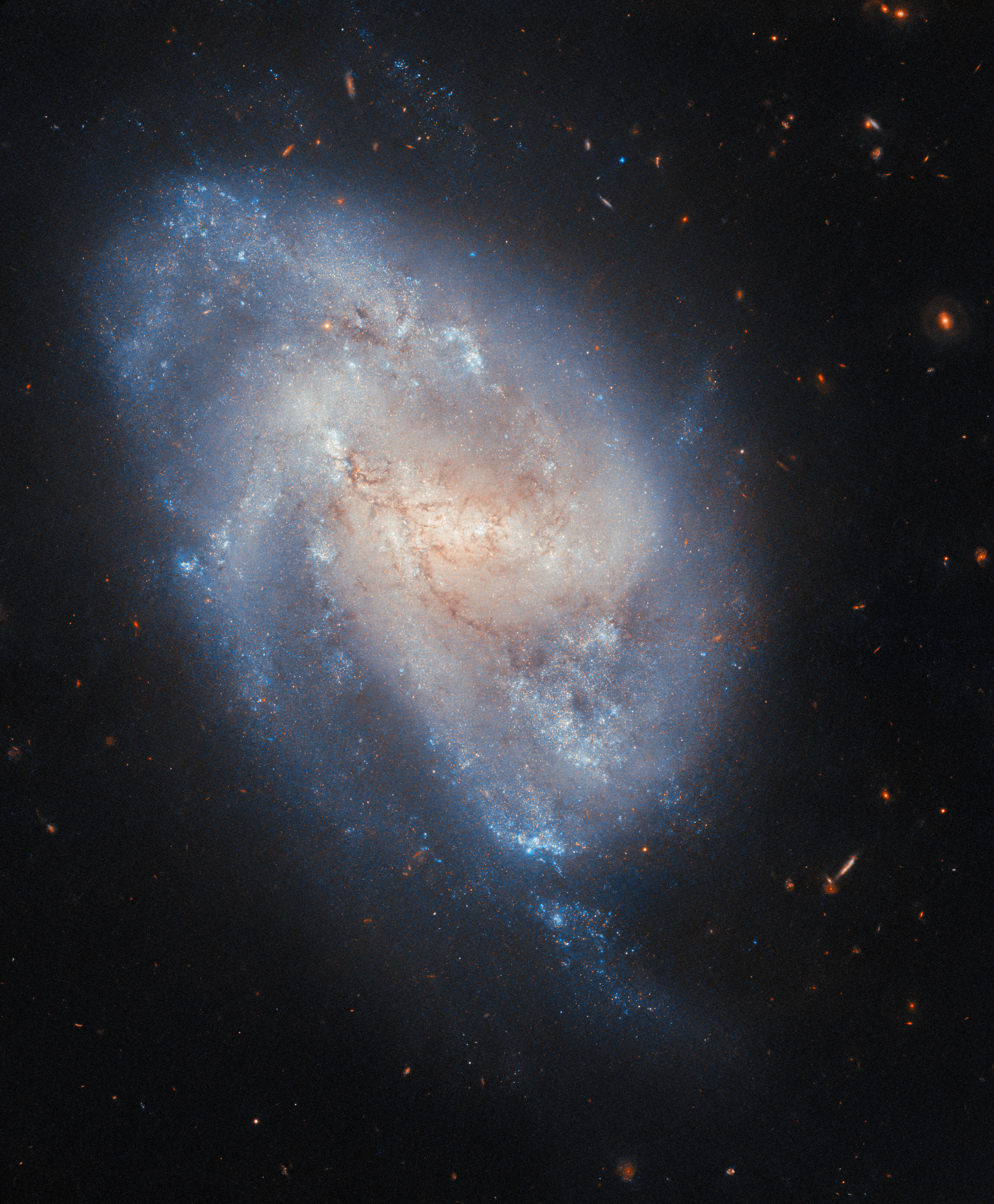
- NGC 337 imaged by the Hubble Space Telescope

Observation data (J2000 epoch)
- Constellation: Cetus
- Right ascension: 00^{h} 59^{m} 50.0064^{s}
- Declination: −07° 34′ 40.94″
- Redshift: 0.005504
- Heliocentric radial velocity: 1650 ± 1 km/s
- Distance: 64.0 ± 4.6 Mly (19.63 ± 1.41 Mpc)
- Group or cluster: NGC 337 Group (LGG 15)
- Apparent magnitude (V): 12.46

Characteristics
- Type: SB(s)d
- Size: ~60,400 ly (18.52 kpc) (estimated)
- Apparent size (V): 2.9' × 1.8'

Other designations
- IRAS 00573-0750, 2MASX J00595009-0734406, MCG -01-03-053, PGC 3572

NGC 337 is a barred spiral galaxy in the constellation Cetus. Its velocity with respect to the cosmic microwave background is 1,331±22 km/s, which corresponds to a Hubble distance of 64.0 ± 4.6 Mly (19.63 ± 1.41 Mpc). Additionally, 20 non-redshift measurements give a similar distance of 63.11 ± 1.81 Mly (19.350 ± 0.556 Mpc).

It was discovered on September 10, 1785 by German-British astronomer William Herschel. It was described by John Dreyer as "pretty faint, large, extended, gradually a little brighter middle, 10th magnitude star 21 seconds of time to the east."

NGC 337 is considered as a Late-Type Morphology galaxy, with a Star Formation Rate (SFR) of 1.62 M⊙ yr⁻¹ and has a Star Formation Efficiency (sSFR) of -9.62.

== Supernovae ==
Two supernovae have been observed in NGC 337:

- SN 2011dq (Type II, mag. 16.3) was discovered by Berto Monard on May 15, 2011.
- SN 2014cx (Type II-P, mag. 15.6) was discovered by Kōichi Itagaki on September 2, 2014.

== NGC 337 Group ==
NGC 337 is the largest and brightest galaxy in the NGC 337 Group (also known as LGG 15). The group includes at least three other galaxies: NGC 274, NGC 275, and NGC 298.

== See also ==
- List of NGC objects (1–1000)
