= NGC 4323 =

Galaxy in the constellation Coma Berenices

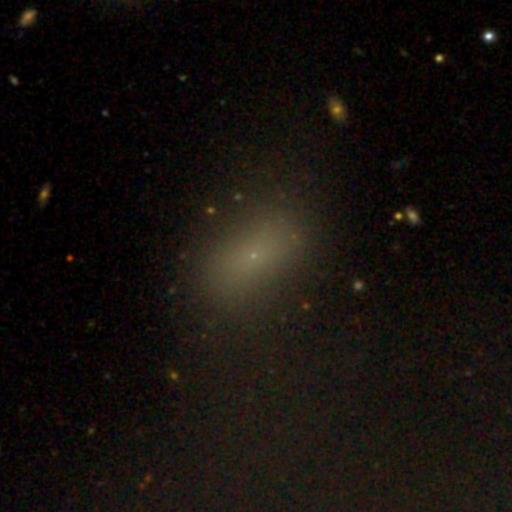
- SDSS image of NGC 4323.

Observation data (J2000 epoch)
- Constellation: Coma Berenices
- Right ascension: 12^{h} 23^{m} 01.7^{s}
- Declination: 15° 54′ 20″
- Redshift: 0.006182
- Heliocentric radial velocity: 869 km/s
- Distance: 52.5 Mly
- Group or cluster: Virgo Cluster
- Apparent magnitude (V): 15.1g

Characteristics
- Type: SB0^0(r), dE
- Mass: 1.7×10^{9} M_{☉}
- Size: ~23,000 ly (7 kpc) (estimated)
- Apparent size (V): 0.953′ × 0.610′

Other designations
- PGC 40171, VCC 608, MCG +03-32-016

NGC 4323 is a lenticular or dwarf elliptical galaxy located about 52.5 million light-years away in the constellation Coma Berenices. The galaxy was discovered in 1882 by astronomer Wilhelm Tempel and is a member of the Virgo Cluster.

NGC 4323 is commonly misidentified as NGC 4322, which is a 13th magnitude star.

== Interaction with Messier 100 ==
NGC 4323 is a companion of Messier 100, which lies 78,000 light-years (24 kiloparsecs) away. The two galaxies appear to be interacting, as evidenced by Messier 100's rotation curve, an asymmetry of its HI disk, and a faint, optical bridge that connects it to NGC 4323. However, Knapen et al. suggests that the two galaxies are not interacting as NGC 4323 is a small galaxy and has a large separation from Messier 100.

== See also ==
- List of NGC objects (4001–5000)
