= NGC 297 =

Elliptical galaxy in the constellation Cetus

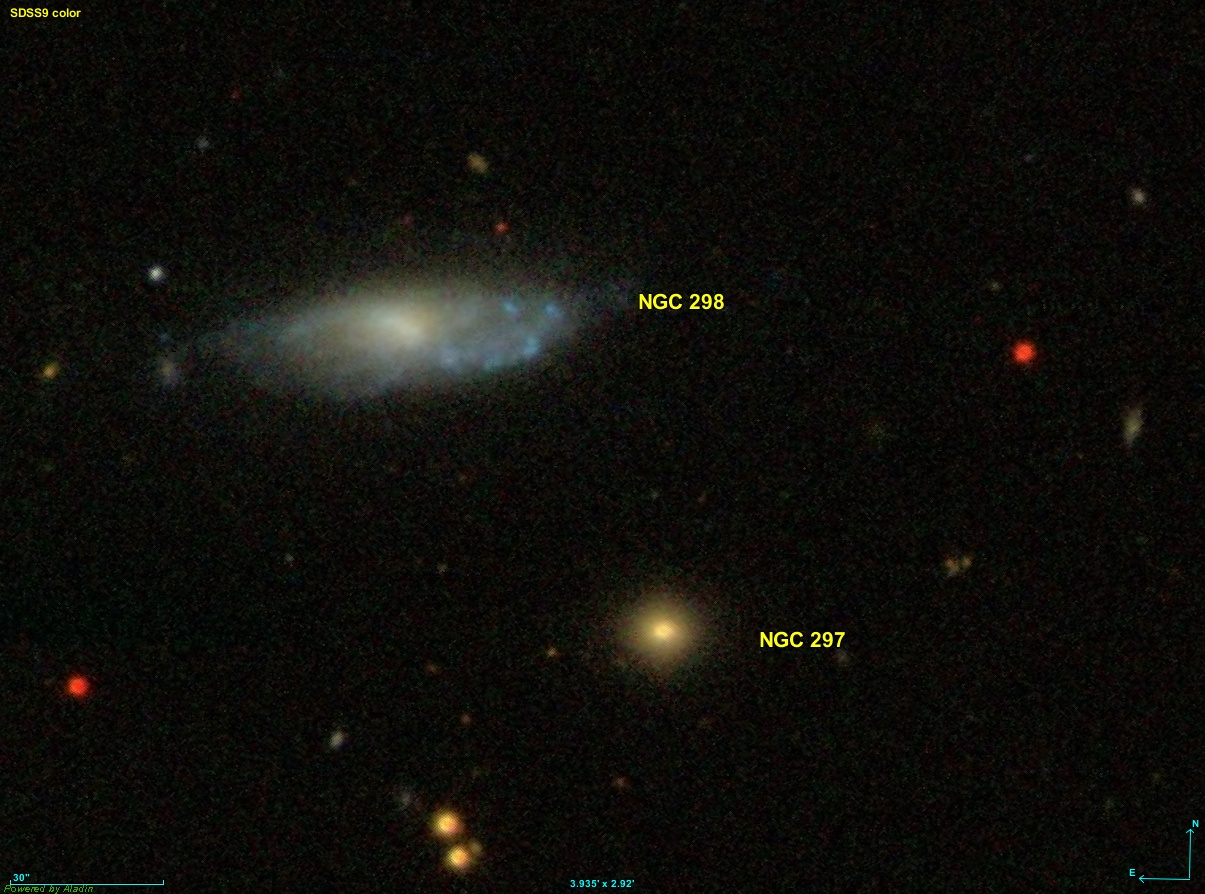
- SDSS image of NGC 297 (below right of center)

Observation data (J2000 epoch)
- Constellation: Cetus
- Right ascension: 00^{h} 54^{m} 58.9^{s}
- Declination: −07° 20′ 59″
- Redshift: 0.050778
- Heliocentric radial velocity: 15223 km/s
- Distance: 717 Mly (219.7 Mpc)
- Apparent magnitude (V): 17.27

Characteristics
- Type: cE3: pec?
- Apparent size (V): 0.33' × 0.29'

Other designations
- 2MASX J00545892-0720591, 6dF J0054589-072059, PGC 1020464

NGC 297 is an elliptical galaxy in the constellation Cetus. It was discovered on September 27, 1864, by Albert Marth and is classified as type E3, based on galaxy morphological classification.

To date, according to redshift measurements, a current distance of 236 Mpc (~770 Mly) is given for NGC 297. This value falls within the range of Hubble distance values.
