= Wide Field Camera 3 =

Astronomical camera on the Hubble Space Telescope

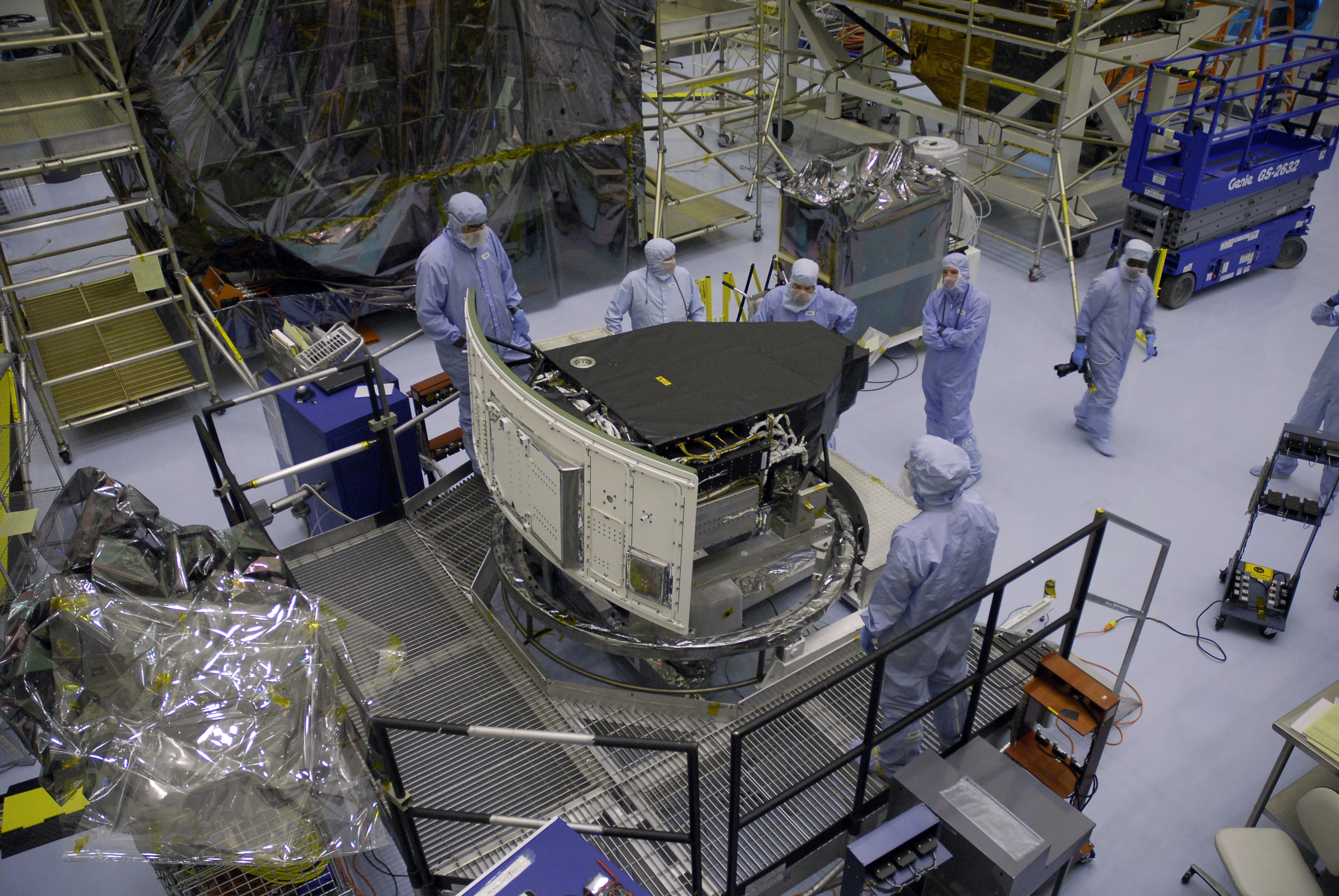
The Wide Field Camera 3 being prepared for its launch aboard STS-125

The Wide Field Camera 3 (WFC3) is the Hubble Space Telescope's last and most technologically advanced instrument to take images in the visible spectrum. It was installed as a replacement for the Wide Field and Planetary Camera 2 during the first spacewalk of Space Shuttle mission STS-125 (Hubble Space Telescope Servicing Mission 4) on May 14, 2009.

As of April 2023, WFC3 was still operating.

== Specifications ==
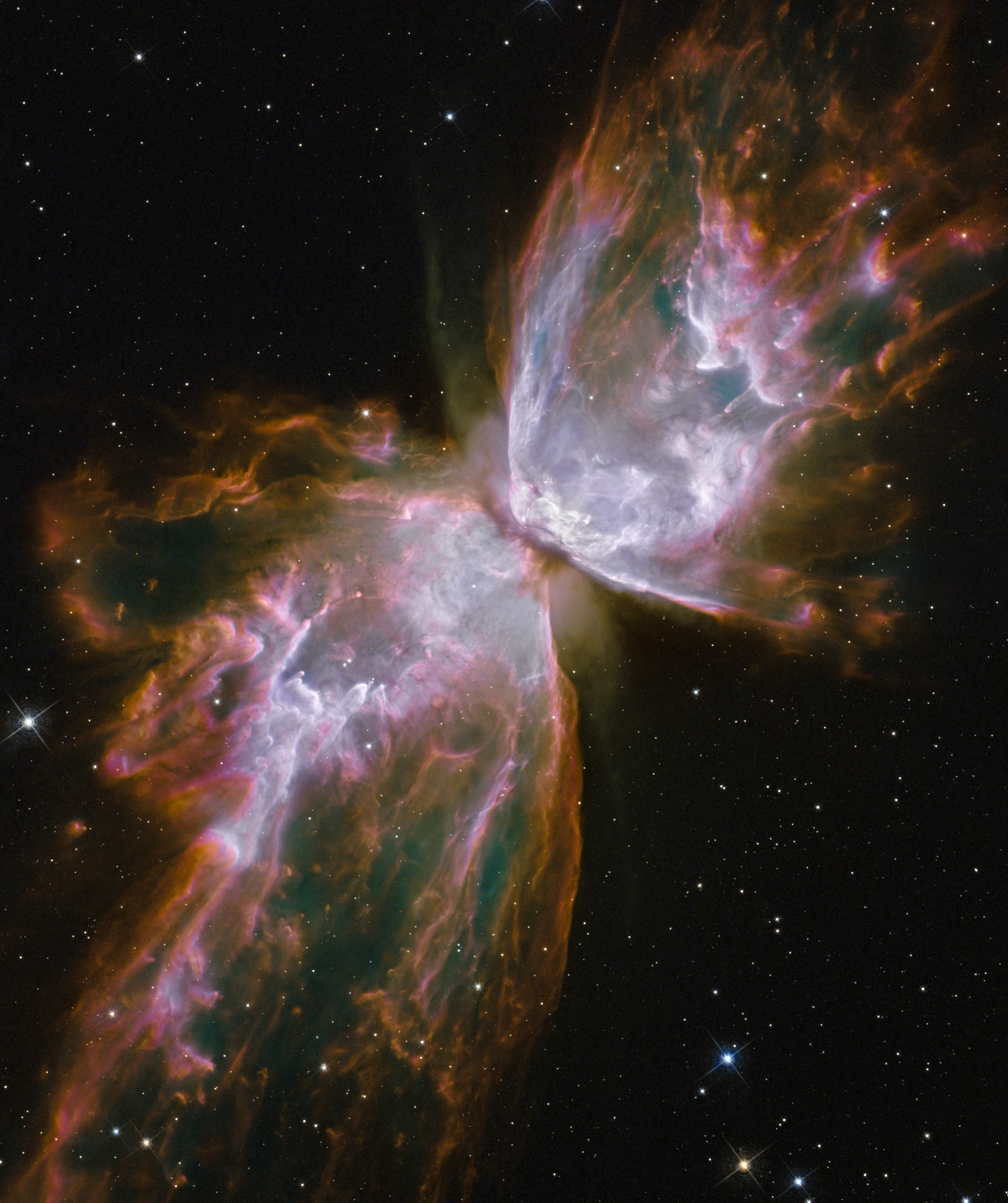
The Butterfly Nebula imaged by WFC3 in 2009

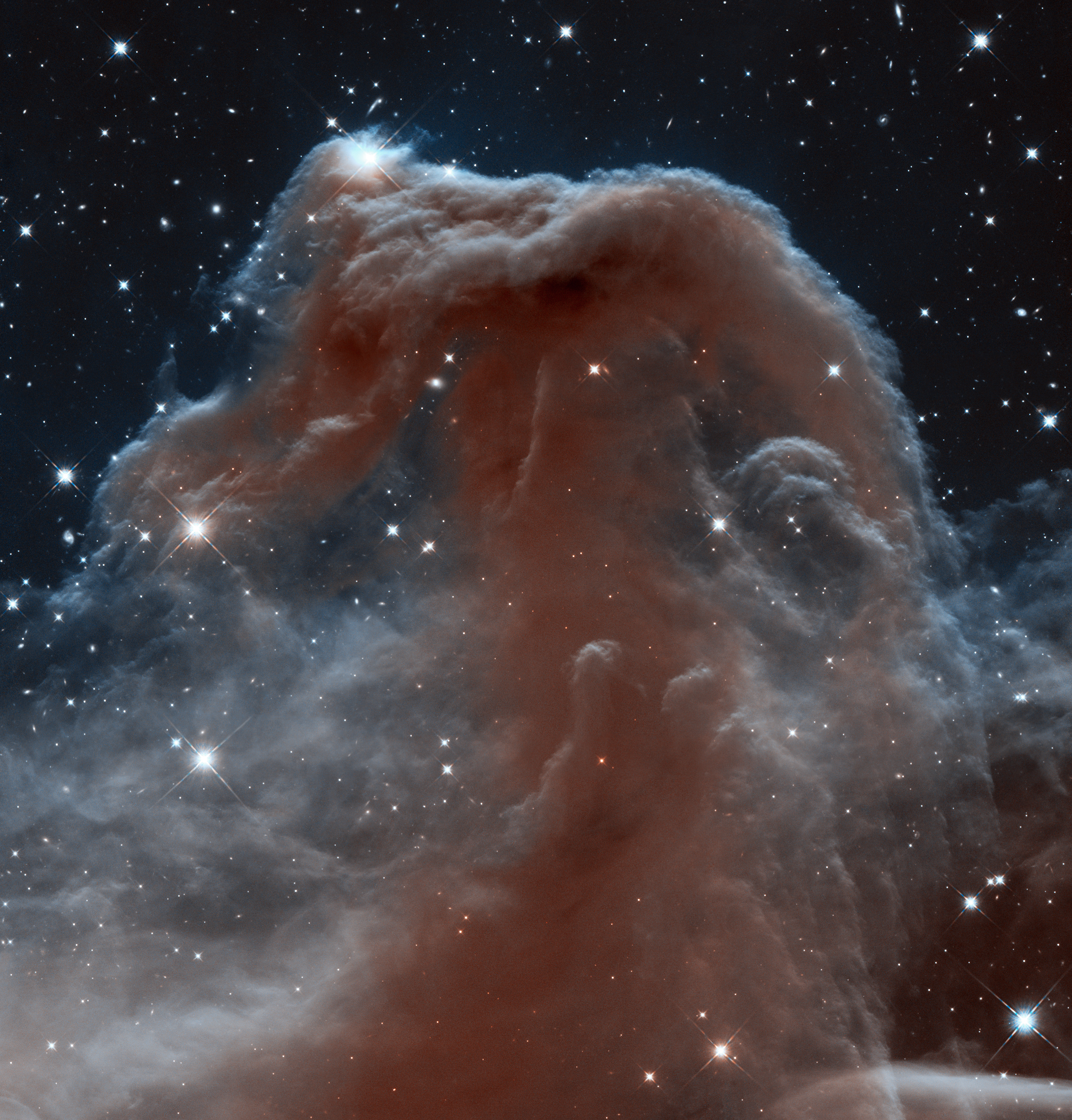
WFC3 infrared view of the Horsehead Nebula

The instrument is designed to be a versatile camera capable of imaging astronomical targets over a very wide wavelength range and with a large field of view. It is a fourth-generation instrument for Hubble.

The instrument has two independent light paths: a UV and optical channel that uses a pair of charge-coupled devices (CCD) to record images from 200 to 1000 nm; and a near infrared detector array that covers the wavelength range from 800 to 1700 nm.

The UV/optical channel has two CCDs, each 2048×4096 pixels, while the IR detector is 1024×1024. The focal planes of both channels were designed specifically for this camera. The optical channel has a field of view of 164 by 164 arcsec (2.7 by 2.7 arcminute, about 8.5% of the diameter of the full moon as seen from Earth) with 0.04 arcsec pixels. This view is comparable to the Wide Field and Planetary Camera 2 and is slightly smaller than that of the Advanced Camera for Surveys. The near infrared channel has a field of view of 135 by 127 arcsec (2.3 by 2.1 arcminutes) with 0.13 arcsec pixels, and has a much larger field of view than Near Infrared Camera and Multi-Object Spectrometer, which it was designed to largely replace. The near infrared channel is a pathfinder for the future James Webb Space Telescope.

Both channels have a variety of broad and narrow-band filters, as well as prisms and grisms, which enable wide-field, very-low-resolution spectroscopy that is useful for surveys. The optical channel covers the visible spectrum (380 nm to 780 nm) with high efficiency, and is also able to see into the near ultraviolet (down to 200 nm).

The IR channel is designed to lack sensitivity beyond 1700 nm (as compared with the 2500 nm limit for NICMOS) to avoid being swamped by thermal background coming from the relatively warm HST structure. This allows WFC3 to be cooled using a thermoelectric cooler instead of carrying a consumable cryogen to cool the instrument.

The camera makes use of returned space hardware as the structure is built from the original Wide Field and Planetary Camera as well as the filter assembly. These were switched for the Wide Field and Planetary Camera 2 by the servicing mission STS-61 in December 1993.

WFC3 was originally conceived as an optical channel only; the near infrared channel was added later. WFC3 is intended to ensure that Hubble retains a powerful imaging capability through to the end of its lifetime.

== History ==
WFC3 had been in the planning since the Spring of 1998. It was built by a team of highly experienced Hubble engineers and scientists drawn from many organizations, with leadership at Goddard Space Flight Center in Maryland. WFC3 was constructed mostly at Goddard Space Flight Center and Ball Aerospace in Colorado. Various parts were built by contractors across the United States and the United Kingdom.

The instrument was scheduled by NASA to launch with STS-125 on 14 October 2008, but the mission was postponed due to additional repairs that were required. The mission launched on 11 May 2009 and the WFC3 was installed on 14 May. by astronauts John M. Grunsfeld and Andrew J. Feustel.

=== WFC3 Pillars of Creation ===
In celebration of the 25th anniversary since the launch of the Hubble Space Telescope, astronomers assembled a larger and higher-resolution photograph of the Pillars of Creation, which was unveiled in January 2015 at the American Astronomical Society meeting in Seattle. The image was photographed by the Hubble Telescope's Wide Field Camera 3, installed in 2009, and produced using near-infrared and visible light exposure.

The 1995 version of this picture of part of the Eagle nebula was taken with WFPC2.

=== 2015 onwards ===
On January 8, 2019, the instrument experienced a suspected hardware problem and the onboard computer suspended operations with the WFC3 while other instruments continued operation. NASA later stated that the issue was software related and brought the instrument to normal status on January 17, 2019.

== Gallery ==
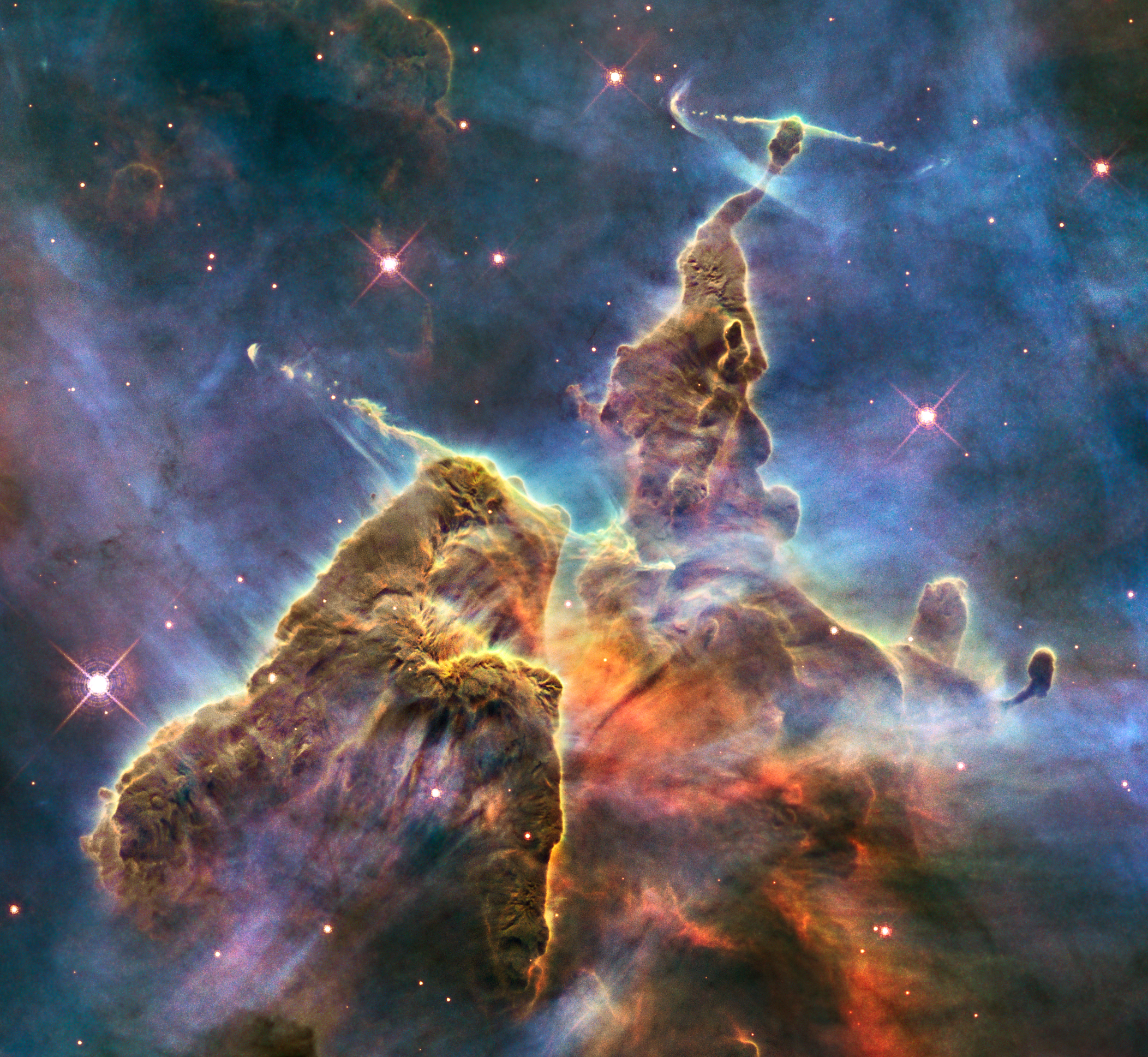
WFC3 view of Mystic Mountain in the Carina Nebula

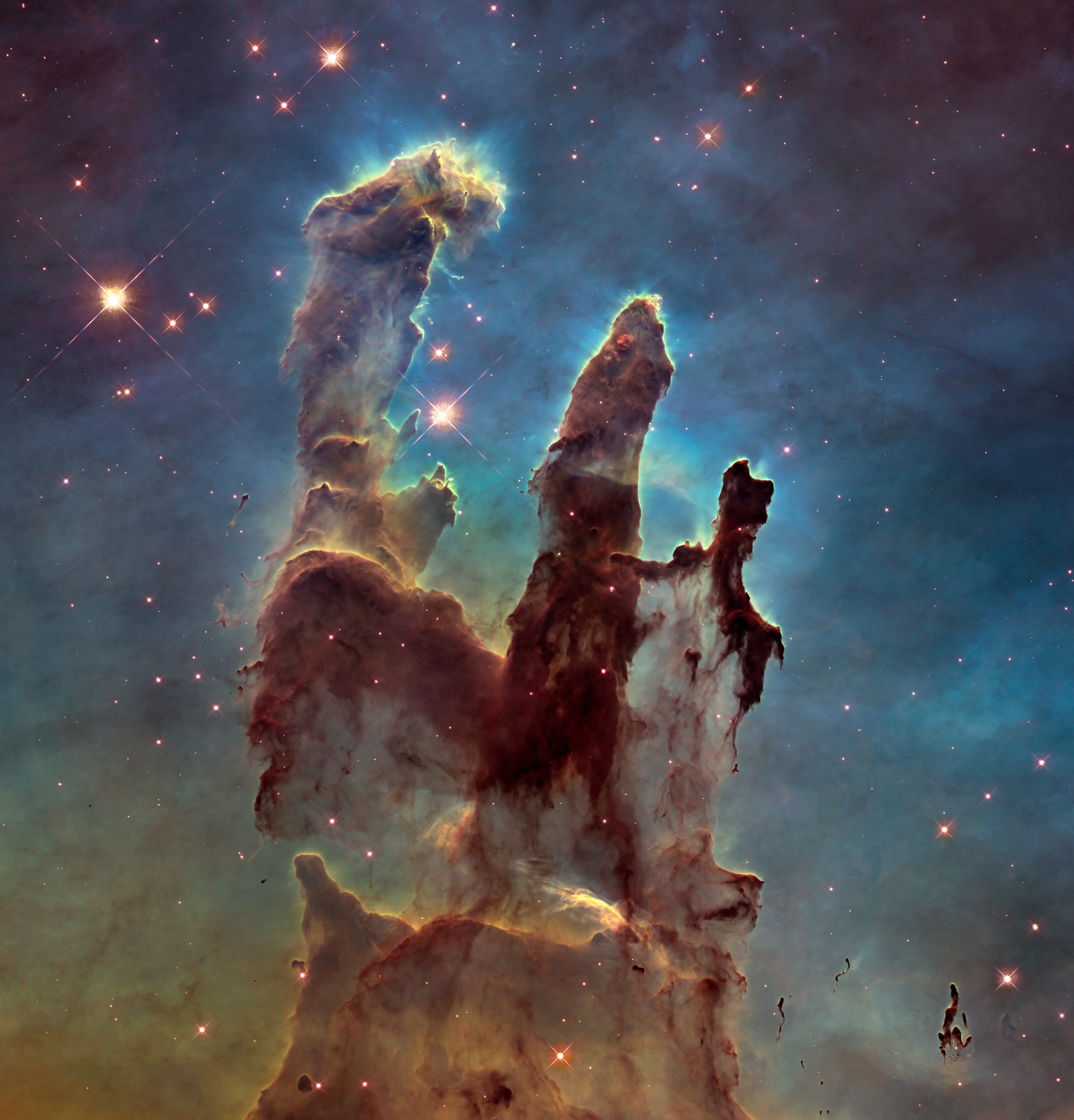
A higher-resolution HST image of the Pillars of Creation in the Eagle Nebula, taken in 2014 as a tribute to the original photograph

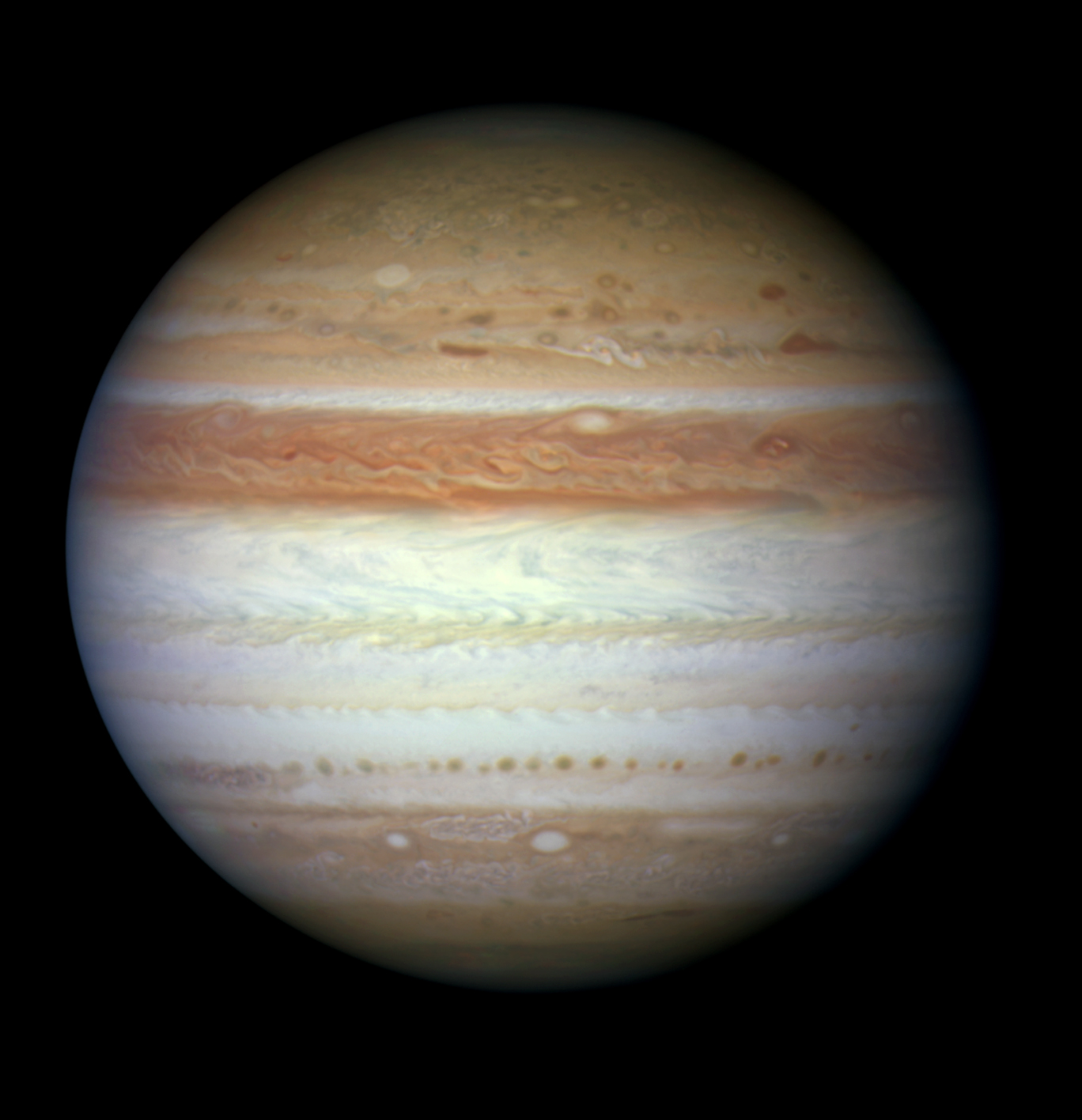
Jupiter in 2010, by WFC3

== See also ==
HST instruments :

- Wide Field and Planetary Camera
- Wide Field and Planetary Camera 2
- Advanced Camera for Surveys
- Cosmic Origins Spectrograph
- Faint Object Camera
- Faint Object Spectrograph
- Goddard High Resolution Spectrograph
- Near Infrared Camera and Multi-Object Spectrometer
- Space Telescope Imaging Spectrograph

Other space telescopes and their instruments :

- Spitzer Space Telescope (Great Observatory for infrared, launched 2003)
  - Infrared Array Camera (Spitzer near to mid infrared camera)
- NIRCam (Near IR camera under 5-micron light for JWST)
