= Messier 100 =

Galaxy in the constellation Coma Berenices

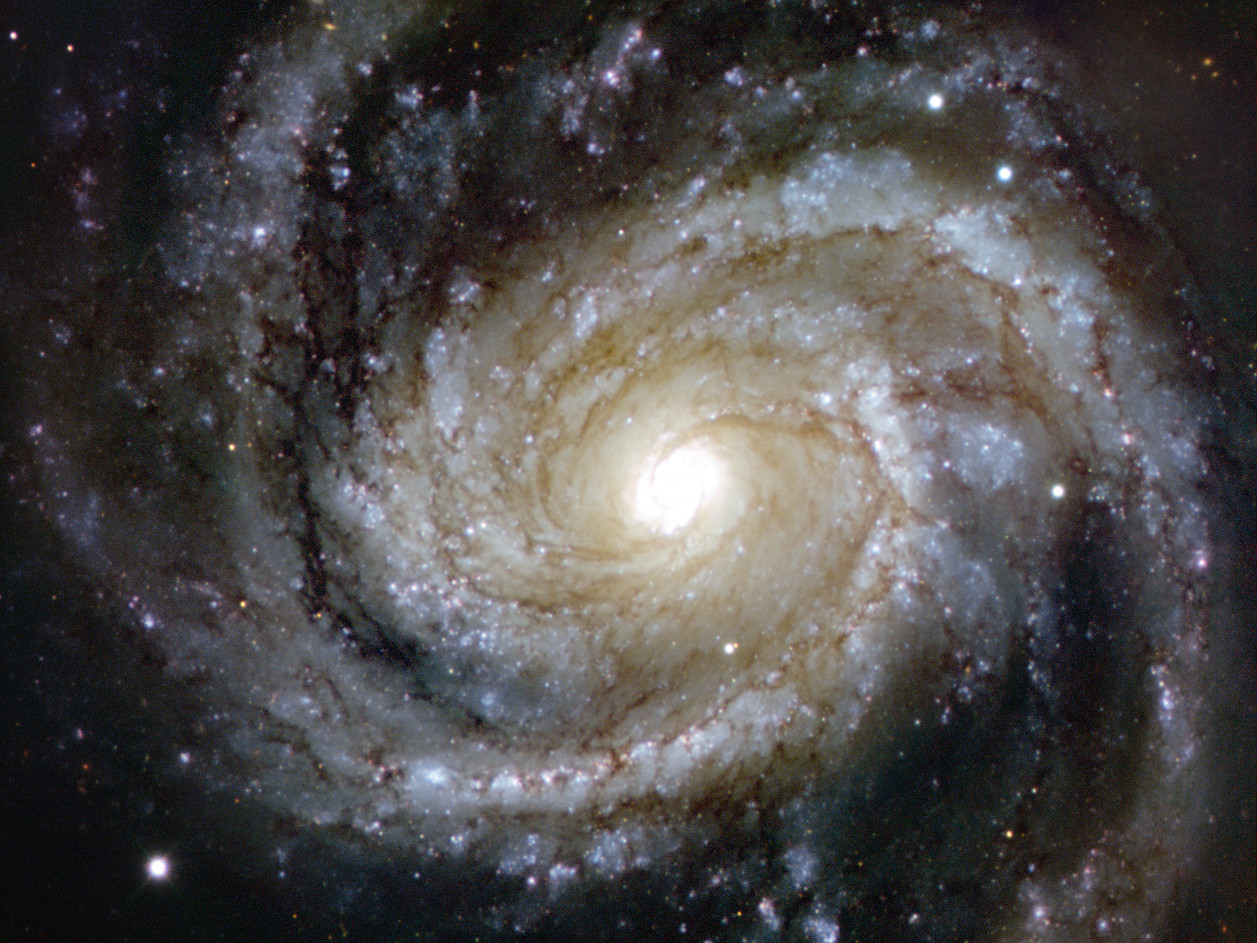
- Galaxy Messier 100 imaged by ESO, revealing complex spiral arm structure

Observation data (J2000 epoch)
- Constellation: Coma Berenices
- Right ascension: 12^{h} 22^{m} 54.8616^{s}
- Declination: +15° 49′ 17.886″
- Redshift: 0.005240
- Heliocentric radial velocity: 1,571±1 km/s
- Distance: 55 Mly
- Group or cluster: Virgo Cluster
- Apparent magnitude (V): 9.3

Characteristics
- Type: SAB(s)bc
- Number of stars: 400 billion (4×10^{11})
- Size: ~166,100 ly (50.93 kpc) (estimated)
- Apparent size (V): 7.4′ × 6.3′

Other designations
- HOLM 387A, IRAS 12204+1605, NGC 4321, UGC 7450, MCG +03-32-015, PGC 40153, CGCG 099-030

Messier 100 (also known as NGC 4321 or the Mirror Galaxy) is a grand design intermediate spiral galaxy in the constellation of Coma Berenices. It is one of the brightest and largest galaxies in the Virgo Cluster and is approximately 55 million light-years from the Milky Way, about 166,000 light-years in diameter. It was discovered by Pierre Méchain in 1781 (Note: On March 15) and 29 days later seen again and entered by Charles Messier in his catalogue "of nebulae and star clusters". It was one of the first spiral galaxies to be discovered, and was listed as one of fourteen spiral nebulae by Lord William Parsons of Rosse in 1850. NGC 4323 and NGC 4328 are satellite galaxies of M100; the former is connected with it by a bridge of luminous matter.

== Early observations ==
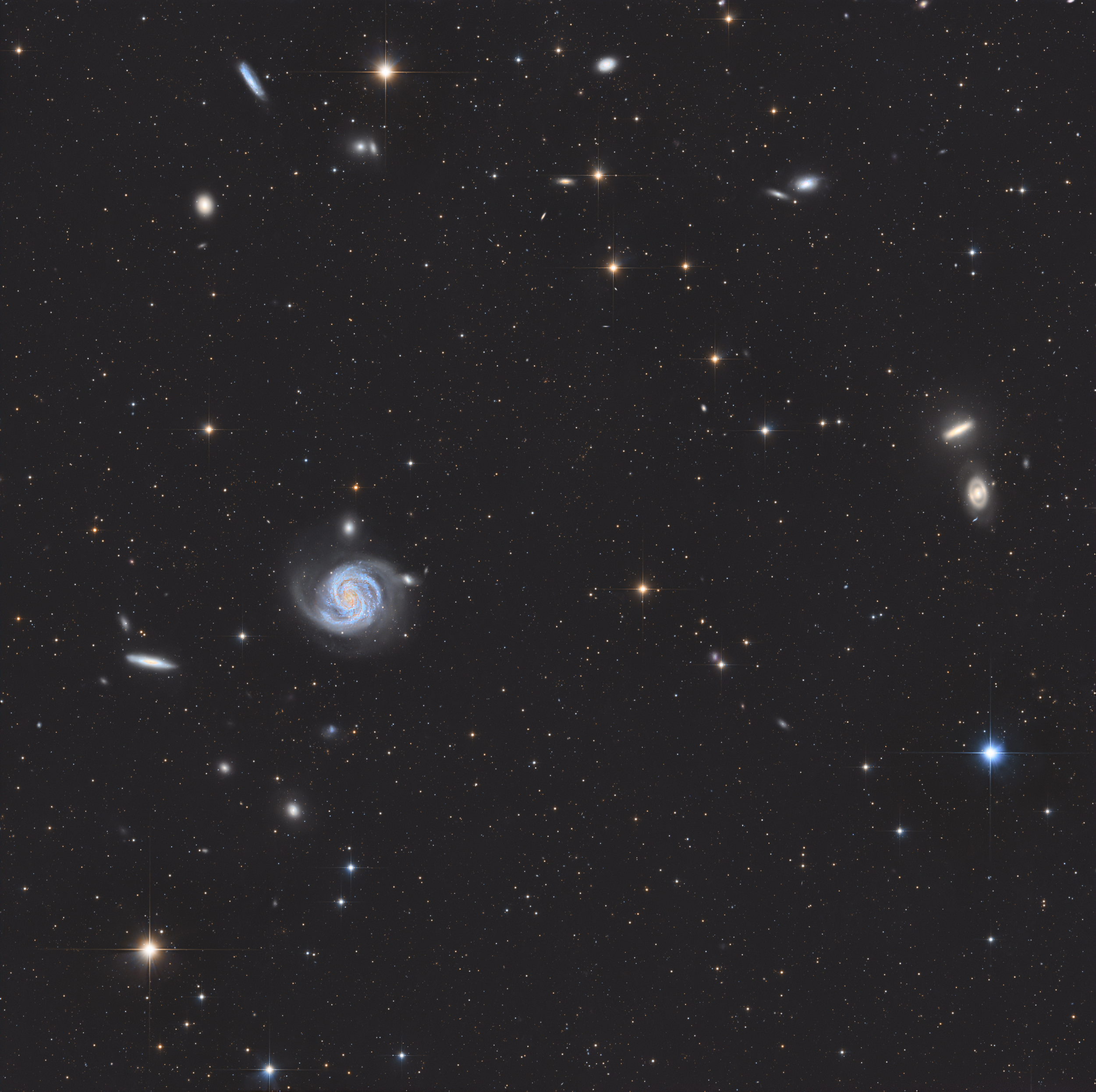
This is a widefield view of the galaxy, M100, directly left of the center of the picture - captured with an amateur telescope in 2025.

After the discovery of M100 by Méchain, Charles Messier made observations of the galaxy depicting it as a nebula without a star. He pointed out that it was difficult to recognize the nebula because of its faintness. William Herschel was able to identify a bright cluster of stars within the "nebula" during his observations. His son John expanded the findings in 1833. With the advent of better telescopes, John Herschel was able to see a round, brighter galaxy; however, he also mentioned that it was barely visible through clouds. William Henry Smyth extended the studies of M100, detailing it as a pearly white nebula and pointing out diffuse spots.

== Star formation ==
Messier 100 is considered a starburst galaxy with the strongest star formation activity concentrated in its center, within a ring – actually two tightly wound spiral arms attached to a small nuclear bar of radius: one thousand parsecs – where star formation has been taking place for at least 500 million years in separate bursts.

== Supernovae ==
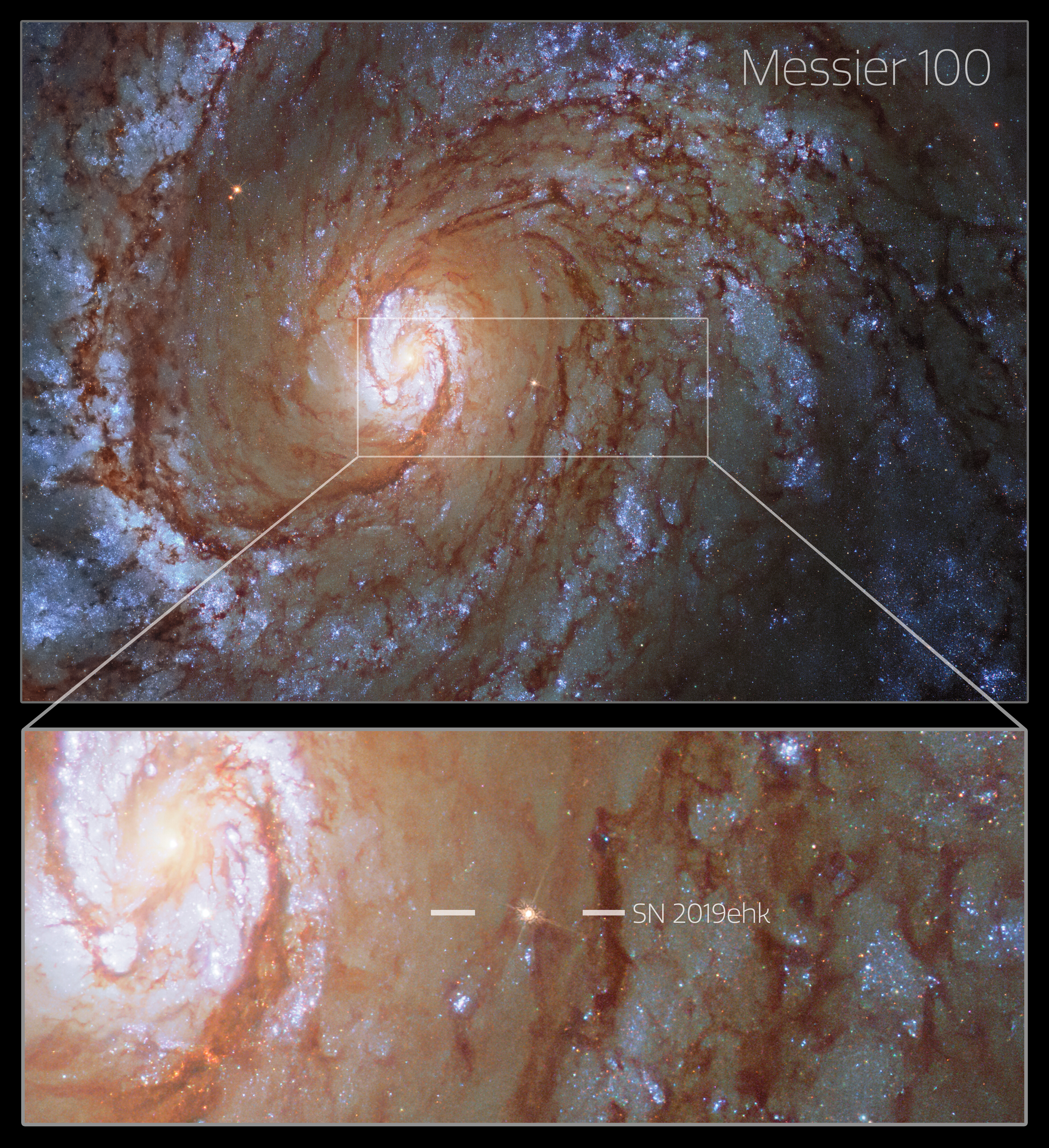
Supernova SN 2019ehk in M100 (Hubble)

Seven supernovae have been identified in M100:

- On 17 March 1901 Heber Curtis discovered SN 1901B (Type I, mag. 15.6), at 110"W and 4"N from the galaxy's nucleus.
- Heber Curtis discovered SN 1914A (type unknown, mag. 15.7) on 2 March 1914, at 24"E and 111"S from the galaxy's nucleus.
- Milton Humason, with observations from early to mid 1960, (Note: February 21 to June 17) discovered SN 1959E (Type I, mag. 17.5), located 58"E and 21"S from the galaxy's nucleus.
- On 15 April 1979, amateur astronomer Gus Johnson discovered SN 1979C, the first Type II supernova found in the M100 galaxy. However, the star faded quickly, and later observations from x-ray to radio wavelengths revealed its remnant.
- SN 2006X (Type Ia, mag. 15.3) was discovered by Shoji Suzuki and Marco Migliardi on 7 February 2006, two weeks before fading to magnitude 17.
- Jaroslaw Grzegorzek discovered SN 2019ehk (Type Ib, mag. 16.5) on 29 April 2019. The supernova reached a peak magnitude of approximately 15.8.
- SN 2020oi (Type Ic, mag. 17.28) was discovered by Automatic Learning for the Rapid Classification of Events (ALeRCE) on 7 January 2020.

== See also ==
- List of Messier objects
