= Anne L. Kinney =

American scientist

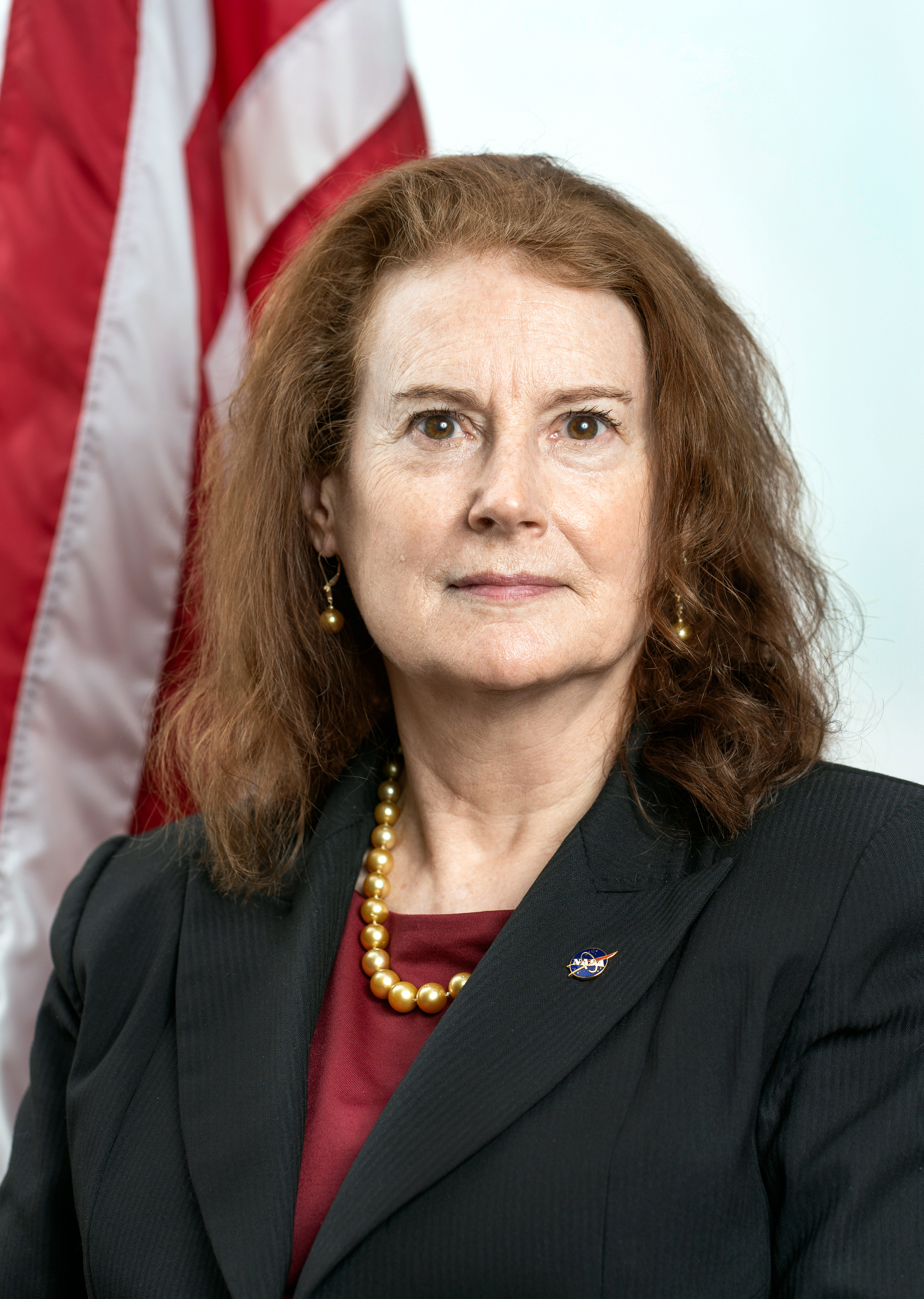
Kinney as deputy center director of NASA’s Goddard Space Flight Center, 2020 official photograph

Anne L. Kinney is an American space scientist and educator. Kinney is currently the Deputy Center Director at NASA Goddard Space Flight Center. Previously, she held positions as the head of the Directorate for Mathematical and Physical Sciences (MPS) for the National Science Foundation (NSF), the Chief Scientist of the W.M. Keck Observatory, Director of the Solar System Exploration Division at NASA Goddard Space Flight Center, Director of the Origins Program at NASA Jet Propulsion Laboratory, and Director of the Universe Division at NASA Headquarters. She earned a bachelor's degree in astronomy and physics from the University of Wisconsin-Madison and a doctorate in astrophysics from New York University, and has published more than 80 papers on extragalactic astronomy. She was an instrument scientist for the Faint Object Spectrograph that flew on the Hubble Space Telescope.

Throughout her career, she has overseen numerous space missions, including the Spitzer Space Telescope, the Wilkinson Microwave Anisotropy Probe (WMAP), the Galaxy Evolution Explorer (GALEX), the Chandra X-Ray Observatory, the Cosmic Hot Interstellar Plasma Spectrometer (CHIPS), and two Hubble Space Telescope servicing missions. Her work has earned her the Presidential Rank Award for Meritorious Service, the NASA Medal for Outstanding Leadership, and several NASA Group Achievement Awards for the Keck Observatory Archive, the James Webb Space Telescope, the Gamma-ray Large Area Space Telescope (now known as Fermi Gamma-ray Space Telescope), and the Lunar Orbiter Laser Altimeter.

Kinney is a science educator, serving on the Council of the American Astronomical Society, is a visiting scholar at the Institute of Astronomy at Cambridge in the United Kingdom, and has sat on the editorial board of Astronomy Magazine since 1997. While serving at Keck Observatory, she piloted the Keck Visitor Scholars Program, which gives graduate students and post-doctoral fellows hands-on experience in observational astronomy. She did public outreach for the Hubble Space Telescope, forming the Space Telescope Science Institute education group, and created Amazing Space, a website for children to learn science, math, and astronomy.
