= Ball Aerospace & Technologies =

American aerospace company (1956–2024)

Ball Aerospace & Technologies Corp.
- Type: Subsidiary
- Industry: Spacecraft, defense, scientific instruments
- Founded: 1956; 70 years ago
- Defunct: February 16, 2024; 2 years ago
- Fate: Acquired by BAE Systems Inc.
- Headquarters: Broomfield, Colorado, U.S.
- Key people: Dave Kaufman - President
- Number of employees: c. 5,200 (2023)
- Website: www.baesystems.com/en/

Ball Aerospace & Technologies Corp., commonly Ball Aerospace, was an American manufacturer of spacecraft, components and instruments for national defense, civil space and commercial space applications.

Until 2024, the firm was a wholly owned subsidiary of Ball Corporation, with primary offices in Boulder, Colorado, and facilities in Broomfield and Westminster in Colorado, with smaller offices in New Mexico, Ohio, northern Virginia, Missouri and Maryland. It was acquired by BAE Systems Inc. in 2024, and is operated as a new division within BAE called Space & Mission systems.

== History ==
Ball Aerospace began building pointing controls for military rockets in 1956. The aerospace part of the Ball Corporation was then known as Ball Brothers Research Corporation, and later won a contract to build some of NASA's first spacecraft, the Orbiting Solar Observatory satellites. The company has been responsible for numerous technological and scientific projects and continues to provide aerospace technology to NASA and related industries.

Other products and services for the aerospace industry include lubricants, optical systems, star trackers and antennas. As a wholly owned subsidiary of the Ball Corporation, Ball Aerospace was cited in 2023 as the 54th largest defense contractor in the world. Both parent and subsidiary headquarters were co-located in Broomfield, Colorado.

In August 2023, Ball Corporation agreed to divest Ball Aerospace to BAE Systems Inc. for $5.6 billion in cash. On February 14, 2024 the companies announced that all regulatory approvals were in place to allow the deal to complete. The deal was closed on February 16, 2024. The new organization was named BAE Systems Space and Mission Systems (SMS). SMS headquarters remained in Broomfield, while Ball Corporation headquarters consolidated to Westminster, Colorado.

In August 2026, BAE Systems SMS renamed to Aerospace & Mission Systems (AMS).

== Participating projects ==
- The Orbital Express autonomous satellite servicing mission
- The WorldView-2 Earth observation satellite.
- AEROS (satellite)
- Ralph (New Horizons instrument)
- Chandra X-ray Observatory aspect camera (star tracker) and SIM (science instrument module)
- Hubble Space Telescope: seven science instruments (COS, WFC3, ACS, NICMOS, STIS, COSTAR, and GHRS), two star trackers, five major equipment subsystems, and custom tools to support service missions
- James Webb Space Telescope optical mirror system
- Kepler space telescope

== See also ==
- Ball Corporation
