= STS-82 =

1997 American crewed spaceflight to the Hubble Space Telescope

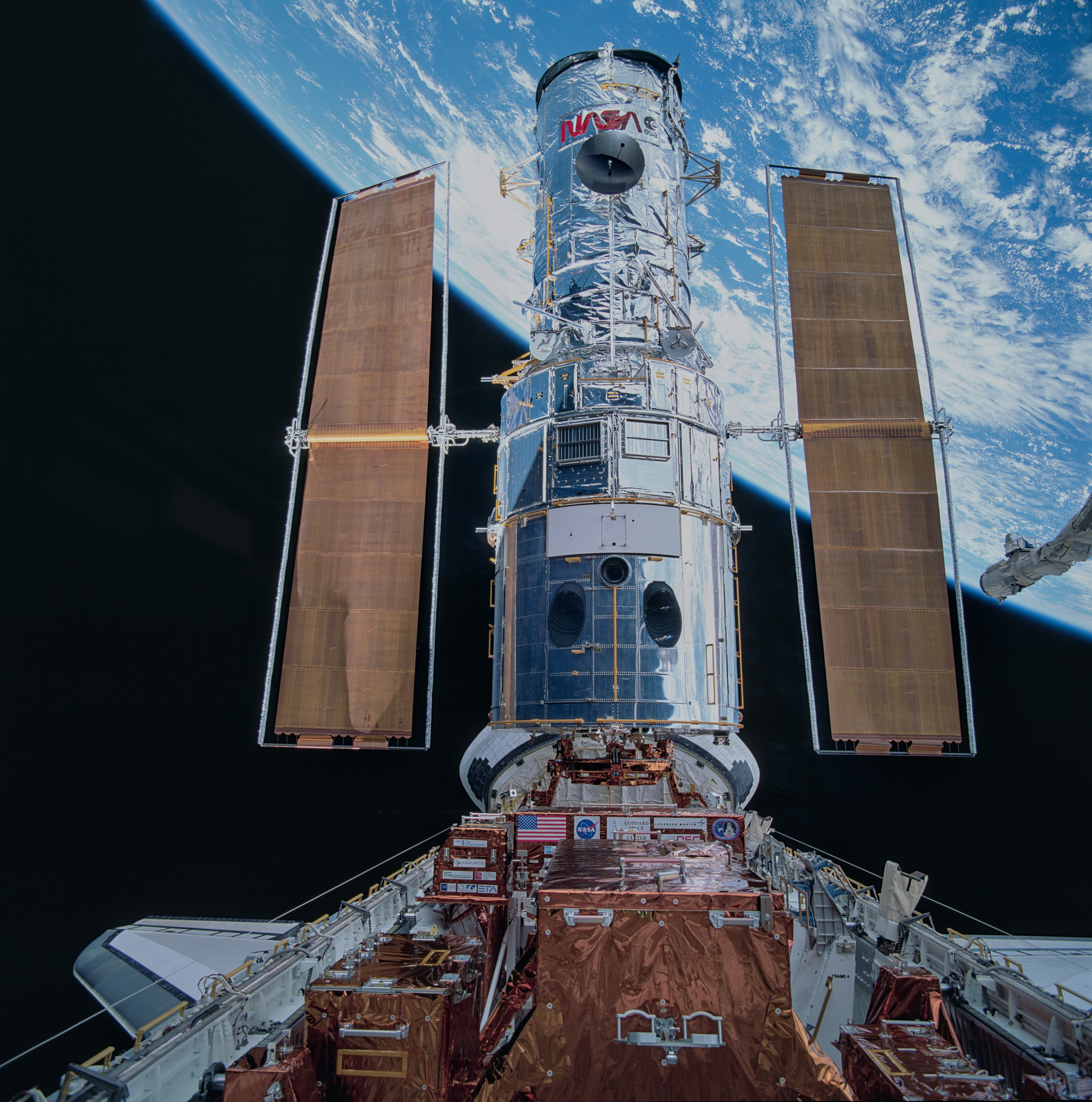
- The Hubble Space Telescope in Space Shuttle Discovery's Payload bay
- Names: Space Transportation System-82
- Mission type: Hubble servicing
- Operator: NASA
- COSPAR ID: 1997-004A
- SATCAT no.: 24719
- Mission duration: 9 days, 23 hours, 38 minutes, 9 seconds
- Distance travelled: 6,100,000 kilometres (3,800,000 mi)
- Orbits completed: 149

Spacecraft properties
- Spacecraft: Space Shuttle Discovery
- Launch mass: 116,884 kilograms (257,685 lb)
- Payload mass: 83,122 kilograms (183,253 lb)

Crew
- Crew size: 7
- Members: Kenneth D. Bowersox; Scott J. Horowitz; Joseph R. Tanner; Steven A. Hawley; Gregory J. Harbaugh; Mark C. Lee; Steven L. Smith

Start of mission
- Launch date: February 11, 1997, 08:55:17 UTC
- Launch site: Kennedy, LC-39A

End of mission
- Landing date: February 21, 1997, 08:32 UTC
- Landing site: Kennedy, SLF Runway 15

Orbital parameters
- Reference system: Geocentric
- Regime: Low Earth
- Perigee altitude: 475 kilometres (295 mi)
- Apogee altitude: 574 kilometres (357 mi)
- Inclination: 28.4698 degrees
- Period: 95.2 min

Capture of Hubble
- RMS capture: 13 February 1997, 08:34 UTC
- RMS release: 19 February 1997, 06:41 UTC
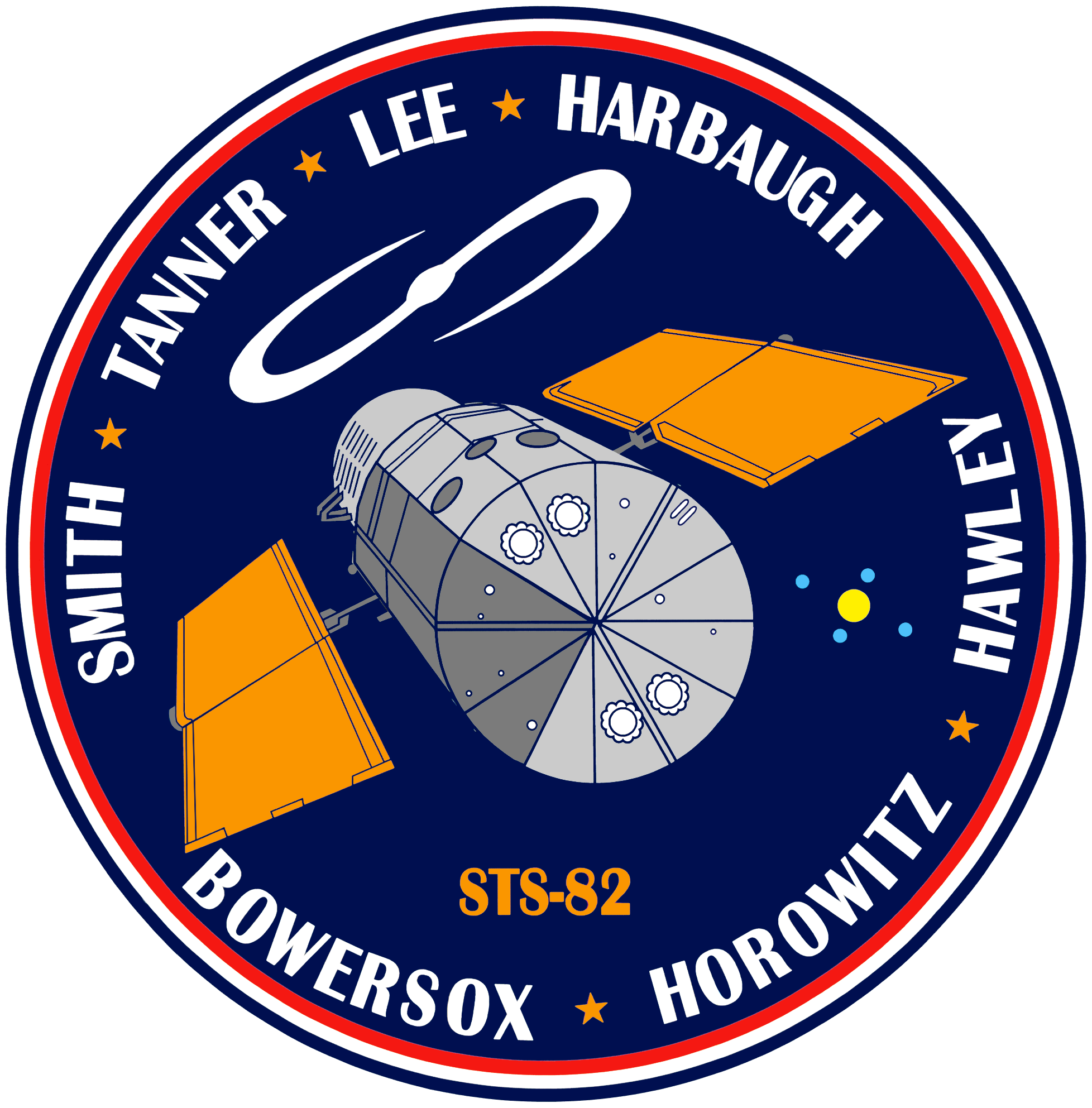
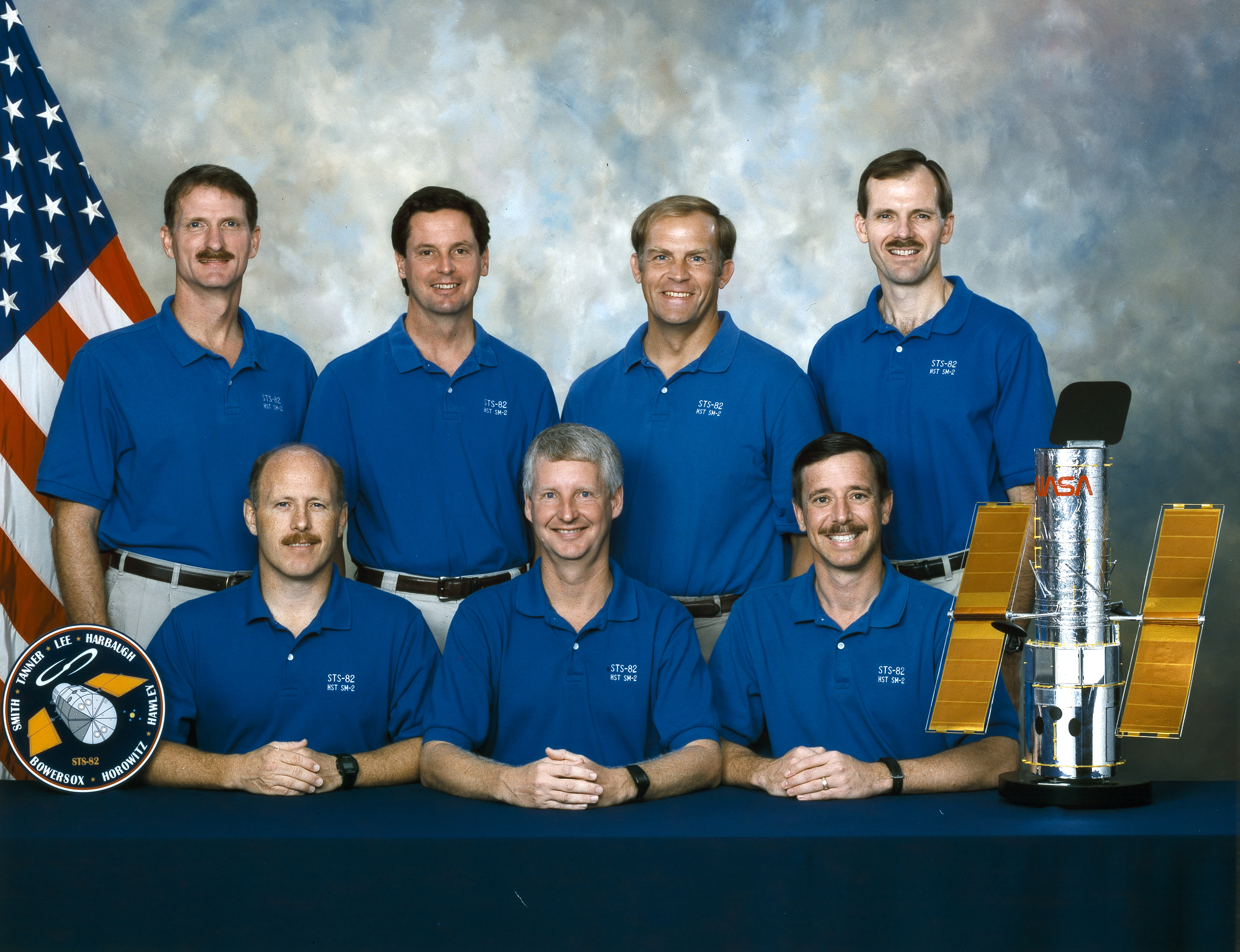
- Left to right - Front: Bowersox, Hawley, Horowitz; Back: Tanner, Harbaugh, Lee, Smith Space Shuttle program Hubble Space Telescope missions

STS-82 was the 22nd flight of the Space Shuttle Discovery and the 82nd mission of the Space Shuttle program. It was NASA's second mission to service the Hubble Space Telescope, during which Discovery's crew repaired and upgraded the telescope's scientific instruments, increasing its research capabilities. Discovery launched from Kennedy Space Center, Florida, on February 11, 1997, returning to Earth on February 21, 1997, at Kennedy Space Center.

== Crew ==
Discovery was crewed by a seven person team for the STS-82 mission.

Position	Astronaut
Commander	Kenneth D. Bowersox; Fourth spaceflight
Pilot	Scott J. Horowitz; Second spaceflight
Mission Specialist 1	Joseph R. Tanner; Second spaceflight
Mission Specialist 2 Flight Engineer	Steven A. Hawley; Fourth spaceflight
Mission Specialist 3	Gregory J. Harbaugh; Fourth and last spaceflight
Mission Specialist 4	Mark C. Lee; Fourth and last spaceflight
Mission Specialist 5	Steven L. Smith; Second spaceflight
Notes: Commander Bowersox had served as pilot of STS-61, the first HST servicing mission.; Hawley had previously flown on STS-31, which deployed the HST.

=== Spacewalks ===
- EVA 1 Lee and Smith
  - Start: February 14, 1997 – 04:34 UTC
  - End: February 14, 1997 – 11:16 UTC
  - Duration: 6 hours, 42 minutes
- EVA 2 Harbaugh and Tanner
  - Start: February 15, 1997 – 03:25 UTC
  - End: February 15, 1997 – 10:52 UTC
  - Duration: 7 hours, 27 minutes
- EVA 3 Lee and Smith
  - Start: February 16, 1997 – 02:53 UTC
  - End: February 16, 1997 – 10:04 UTC
  - Duration: 7 hours, 11 minutes
- EVA 4 Harbaugh and Tanner
  - Start: February 17, 1997 – 03:45 UTC
  - End: February 17, 1997 – 10:19 UTC
  - Duration: 6 hours, 34 minutes
- EVA 5 Lee and Smith
  - Start: February 18, 1997 – 03:15 UTC
  - End: February 18, 1997 – 08:32 UTC
  - Duration: 5 hours, 17 minutes

=== Crew seat assignments ===
Seat	Launch	Landing	Seats 1–4 are on the flight deck. Seats 5–7 are on the mid-deck.
1	Bowersox		Seats 1–4 are on the flight deck. Seats 5–7 are on the mid-deck.
2	Horowitz		Seats 1–4 are on the flight deck. Seats 5–7 are on the mid-deck.
3	Tanner	Harbaugh	Seats 1–4 are on the flight deck. Seats 5–7 are on the mid-deck.
4	Hawley		Seats 1–4 are on the flight deck. Seats 5–7 are on the mid-deck.
5	Harbaugh	Tanner	Seats 1–4 are on the flight deck. Seats 5–7 are on the mid-deck.
6	Lee		Seats 1–4 are on the flight deck. Seats 5–7 are on the mid-deck.
7	Smith		Seats 1–4 are on the flight deck. Seats 5–7 are on the mid-deck.

== Mission objectives ==
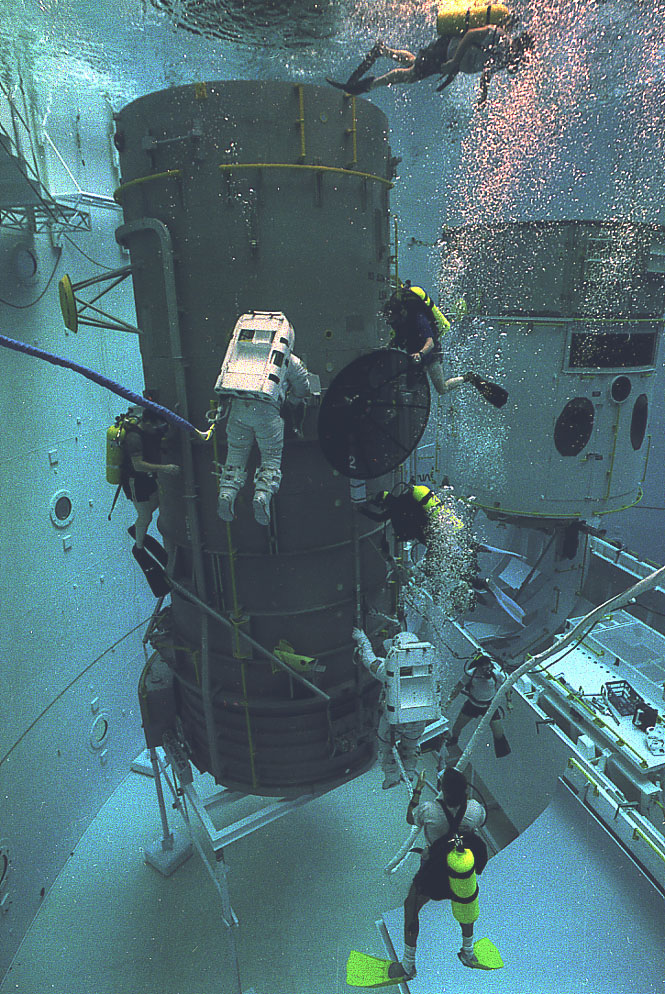
Astronauts train in the Neutral Buoyancy Simulator with a mockup of the Hubble Space Telescope

The STS-82 mission was the second in a series of planned servicing missions to the orbiting Hubble Space Telescope ("HST"), which had been placed in orbit on April 24, 1990, by Discovery during STS-31. The first servicing mission was done by Space Shuttle Endeavour on STS-61. Work performed by Discovery's crew significantly upgraded the scientific capabilities of the HST and helped to keep the telescope functioning smoothly until the next scheduled servicing missions, which were STS-103 in 1999 and STS-109 in 2002.

On the third day of the mission, Discovery's seven-member crew conducted the first of four spacewalks (also called Extra-vehicular Activities or "EVAs") to remove two older instruments and install two new astronomy instruments, as well as perform other servicing tasks. The two older instruments being replaced were the Goddard High Resolution Spectrograph and the Faint Object Spectrograph, exchanged for the Space Telescope Imaging Spectrograph (STIS) and the Near Infrared Camera and Multi-Object Spectrometer (NICMOS), respectively.

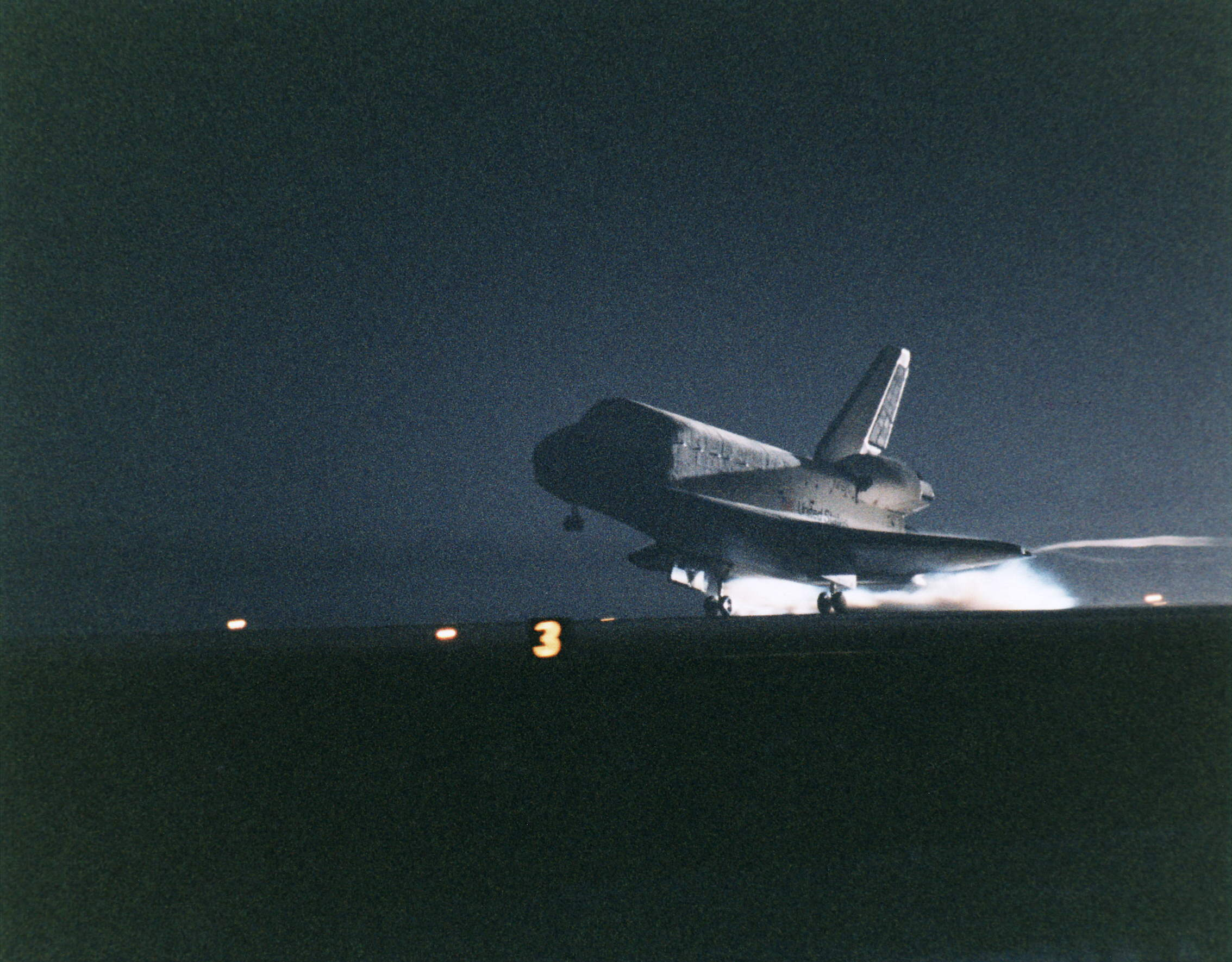
STS-82 landing

In addition to installing the new instruments, astronauts replaced other existing hardware with upgrades and spares. Hubble received a refurbished Fine Guidance Sensor, an optical device used to provide pointing information for the telescope and as a scientific instrument for astrometric science. The Solid State Recorder (SSR) replaced one of HST's three Engineering Science Tape Recorders (ESTR). An ESTR is a reel-to-reel tape recorder. The SSR, compared to an ESTR, can perform simultaneous recording and playback of data, and store ten times more data. Another ESTR was also replaced, but with a spare ESTR unit. One of Hubble's four Reaction Wheel Assemblies (RWA) -- part of the telescope's Pointing Control Subsystem—was replaced with a refurbished spare. The RWAs use angular momentum to move and maintain the telescope in a desired position. The wheel axes are oriented so that the telescope can provide science with only three wheels operating, if required. Study of the returned mechanism provided a rare opportunity to study equipment that had undergone long-term service (7 years) in space, particularly for the effects of vacuum on lubricants which were found to be in 'excellent condition'.

== Mission results ==
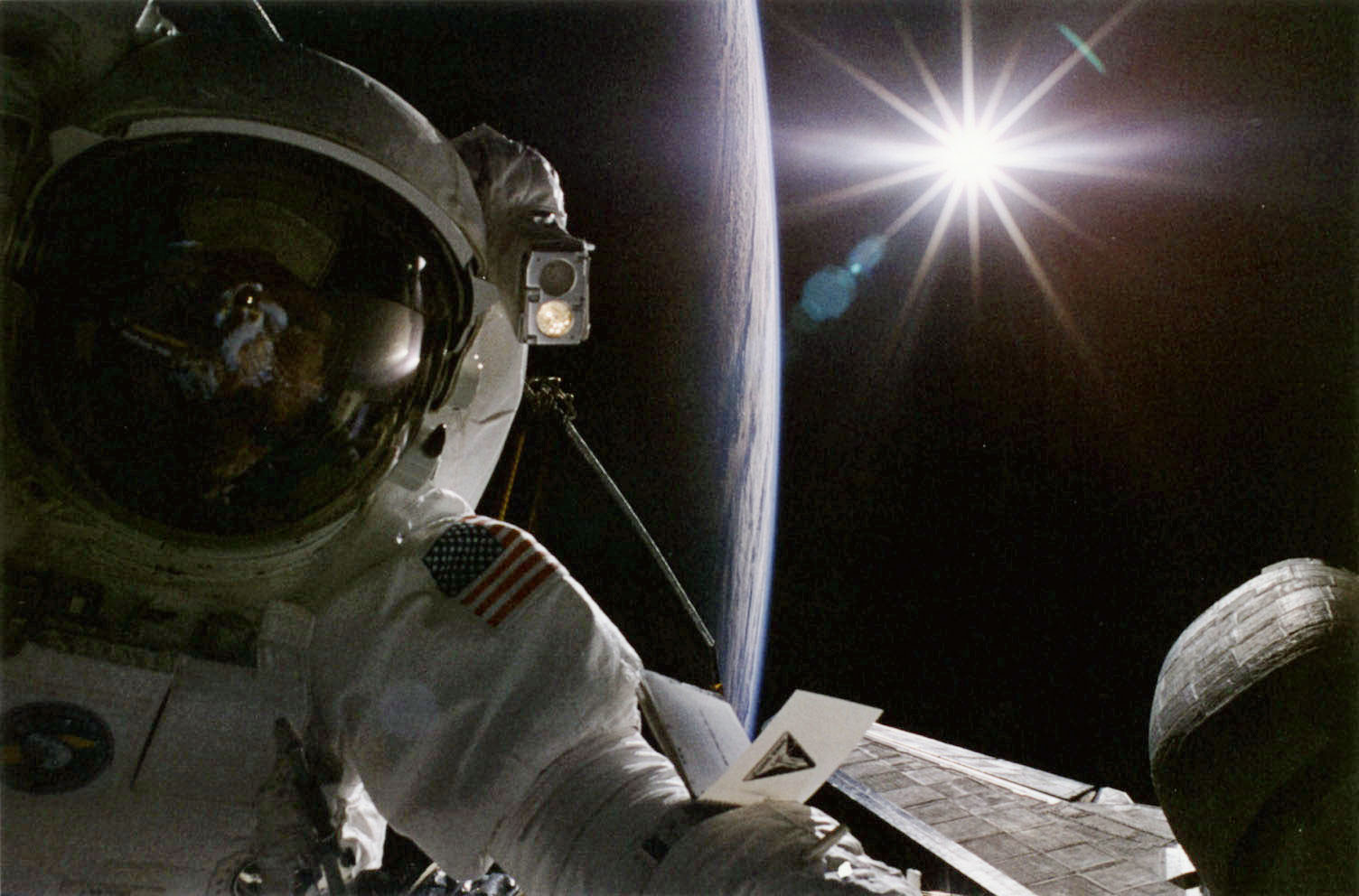
Joseph Tanner performing maintenance on the Hubble Space Telescope.

STS-82 demonstrated anew the capability of the Space Shuttle to service orbiting spacecraft. Discovery's crew completed servicing and upgrading of the Hubble Space Telescope during four planned EVAs, later performing a fifth unscheduled space walk to repair insulation on the telescope.

The Hubble Space Telescope was deployed in April 1990 during STS-31. It was designed to undergo periodic servicing and upgrading over its projected 15-year lifespan, with first servicing performed during STS-61 in December 1993. Hawley, who originally deployed the telescope, operated the orbiter Remote Manipulator System arm on STS-82 to retrieve the telescope for second servicing at 3:34 am EST, Feb 13, and positioned it above Discovery's payload bay less than half an hour later.

Relying on more than 150 tools and crew aids, Lee and Smith performed EVAs 1, 3 and 5, with Harbaugh and Tanner performing EVAs 2 and 4. EVA 1 began at 11:34 pm EST, February 13, and lasted six hours, 42 minutes. One of Hubble's solar arrays was unexpectedly disturbed by a gust of air from Discovery's airlock when it was depressurized, but was not damaged. Lee and Smith removed two scientific instruments from Hubble, the Goddard High Resolution Spectrograph (GHRS) and Faint Object Spectrograph (FOS), and replaced them with the Space Telescope Imaging Spectrograph (STIS) and Near Infrared Camera and Multi-Object Spectrometer (NICMOS), respectively. STIS expected to shed further light on supermassive black holes. NICMOS features more capable infrared detectors and gave astronomers their first clear view of the universe at near infrared wavelengths between 0.8 and 2.5 micrometers.

EVA 2 began at 10:25 pm, February 14, and lasted seven hours, 27 minutes. Harbaugh and Tanner replaced a degraded Fine Guidance Sensor and a failed Engineering and Science Tape Recorder with new spares. Also installed was a new unit called the Optical Control Electronics Enhancement Kit, which further increased the capability of the Fine Guidance Sensor. During this EVA astronauts noted cracking and wear on thermal insulation on the side of HST facing sun and in the direction of travel.

EVA 3 began at 9:53 pm, February 15, and lasted seven hours, 11 minutes. Lee and Smith removed and replaced a Data Interface Unit on Hubble, as well as a reel-to-reel Engineering and Science Tape Recorder with a new digital Solid State Recorder (SSR) that allowed simultaneous recording and playback of data. Also changed out was one of four Reaction Wheel Assembly units that use spin momentum to move telescope toward a target and maintain it in a stable position. After this EVA, mission managers decided to add EVA 5 to repair the thermal insulation on HST.

EVA 4 began at 10:45 pm, February 16, and lasted six hours, 34 minutes. Harbaugh and Tanner replaced a Solar Array Drive Electronics package which controls the positioning of Hubble's solar arrays. Also replaced covers over Hubble's magnetometers and placed thermal blankets of multi-layer material over two areas of degraded insulation around the light shield portion of the telescope just below the top of the observatory. Meanwhile, inside Discovery Horowitz and Lee worked on the middeck to fabricate new insulation blankets for HST.

Final space walk, EVA 5, lasted five hours, 17 minutes. Lee and Smith attached several thermal insulation blankets to three equipment compartments at the top of the Support Systems Module section of the telescope which contain key data processing, electronics and scientific instrument telemetry packages. STS-82 EVA total of 33 hours, 11 minutes is about two hours shy of total EVA time recorded on first servicing mission.

Discovery's maneuvering jets fired several times during the mission to reboost the telescope's orbit by eight nautical miles. Hubble was redeployed on February 19 at 1:41 am, into a 335-nautical-mile (620 km) by 321-nautical-mile (594 km) orbit. Initial checkout of new instruments and equipment during mission showed all were performing nominally. Calibration of the two new science instruments took place over a period of several weeks, with first images and data anticipated in about eight to ten weeks.

== Wake-up calls ==
NASA began a tradition of playing music to astronauts during the Gemini program, which was first used to wake up a flight crew during Apollo 15.

Each track is specially chosen, often by their families, and usually has a special meaning to an individual member of the crew, or is applicable to their daily activities.

Flight Day	Song	Artist/Composer
Day 2	"Magic Carpet Ride"	Steppenwolf
Day 3	"These Are Days"	10,000 Maniacs
Day 4	"Two Princes"	Spin Doctors
Day 5	"Higher Love"	Steve Winwood
Day 6	"The Packerena"	WMYX-FM
Day 7	"Shiny Happy People"	R.E.M.
Day 8	"Dreams"	The Cranberries
Day 9	"That Thing You Do"	The Wonders
Day 10	"Five Hundred Miles Away From Home"	Reba McEntire
Day 11	"Born to Be Wild"	Steppenwolf

== Summary of instruments exchange ==
- Near Infrared Camera and Multi-Object Spectrometer (NICMOS) replaces Goddard High Resolution Spectrograph (GHRS)
- Space Telescope Imaging Spectrograph (STIS) replaced Faint Object Spectrograph (FOS)

== See also ==
- List of human spaceflights
- List of Space Shuttle missions
- Outline of space science
