= Doppler parameter =

Physical parameter commonly used in astrophysics

The Doppler parameter, or Doppler broadening parameter, usually denoted as $b$, is a parameter commonly used in astrophysics to characterize the width of observed spectral lines of astronomical objects. It is defined as

$$b = \sqrt{2} \sigma$$,

where $\sigma$ is the one-dimensional velocity dispersion (Draine 2011, p. 58). Given this parameter, the velocity distribution of the line-emitting/absorbing atoms and ions proximated by a Gaussian can be rewritten as

$$p = \frac{1}{\sqrt{2\pi}}\frac{1}{\sigma}e^{-(v-v_0)^2/2\sigma^2} = \frac{1}{\sqrt{\pi}}\frac{1}{b}e^{-(v-v_0)^2/b^2}$$,

where $p\mathrm{d}v$ is the probability of the velocity along the line of sight being in the interval $[v, v + \mathrm{d}v]$.

The line width is also often specified in terms of the FWHM (full width at half maximum), which is

$$\mathrm{FWHM} = 2\sqrt{2\ln 2}\sigma = 2\sqrt{\ln 2} b \approx 1.665b$$.

== Distribution ==
The Doppler parameters of Lyman-alpha forest absorption lines are in the range 10–100 km s^{−1}, with a median value around $b_m = 36\ \mathrm{km\ s}^{-1}$ that decrease with redshift (Kim et al. 1997). Analyses of the HST/COS dataset of low-redshift quasars gives a median $b$ parameter of around $33\ \mathrm{km\ s}^{-1}$ (Danforth et al. 2016, Gaikwad et al. 2017).

== See also ==
- Doppler broadening
- Doppler spectroscopy
