= Cosmic Origins Spectrograph =

Instrument installed on the Hubble Space Telescope

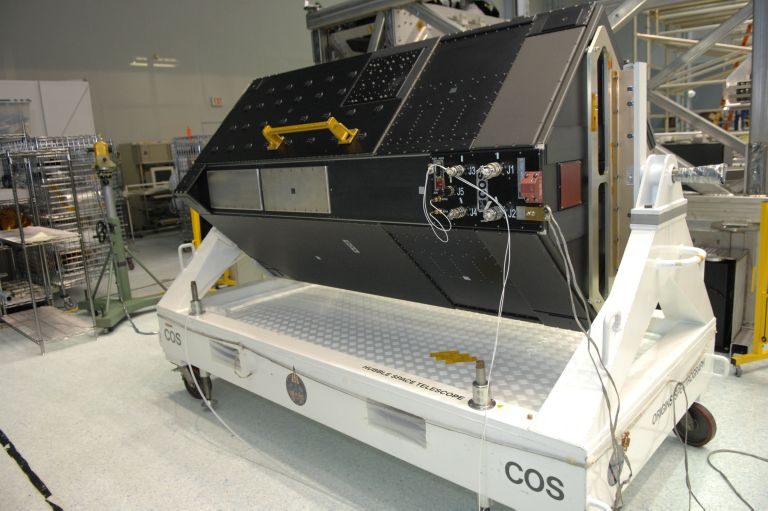
The Cosmic Origins Spectrograph on its handling cart in the Spacecraft Systems Development Facility cleanroom at the Goddard Space Flight Center

The Cosmic Origins Spectrograph (COS) is a science instrument that was installed on the Hubble Space Telescope during Servicing Mission 4 (STS-125) in May 2009. It is designed for ultraviolet (90–320 nm) spectroscopy of faint point sources with a resolving power of ≈1,550–24,000. Science goals include the study of the origins of large scale structure in the universe, the formation and evolution of galaxies, and the origin of stellar and planetary systems and the cold interstellar medium. COS was developed and built by the Center for Astrophysics and Space Astronomy (CASA-ARL) at the University of Colorado at Boulder and the Ball Aerospace and Technologies Corporation in Boulder, Colorado.

COS is installed into the axial instrument bay previously occupied by the Corrective Optics Space Telescope Axial Replacement (COSTAR) instrument, and is intended to complement the Space Telescope Imaging Spectrograph (STIS) that was repaired during the same mission. While STIS operates across a wider wavelength range, COS is many times more sensitive in the UV.

== Instrument overview ==
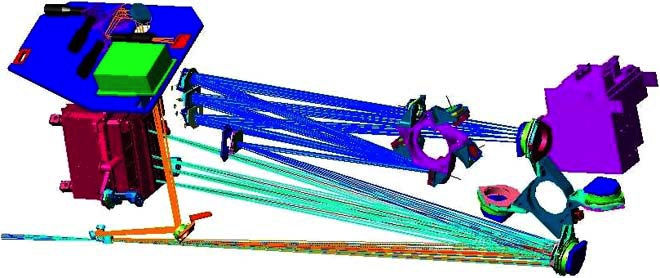
COS Optical Layout. FUV and NUV channels initially share a common path. The first optic is either a concave, holographically ruled diffraction grating that directs light to the FUV detector (red) or a concave mirror directing light to the NUV gratings and the NUV detector (purple). The green colored ray packets represent the FUV optical paths, and blue colored ray packets represent the NUV optical paths. A wavelength reference and flat field delivery system is shown at top left (orange ray packets) and can provide simultaneous wavelength reference spectra during science observations.

The Cosmic Origins Spectrograph is an ultraviolet spectrograph that is optimized for high sensitivity and moderate spectral resolution of compact (point like) objects (stars, quasars, etc.). COS has two principal channels, one for Far Ultraviolet (FUV) spectroscopy covering 90–205 nm and one for Near Ultraviolet (NUV) spectroscopy spanning 170–320 nm. The FUV channel can work with one of three diffraction gratings, the NUV with one of four, providing both low and medium resolution spectra (table 1). In addition, COS has a narrow field of view NUV imaging mode intended for target acquisition.

One key technique for achieving high sensitivity in the FUV is minimizing the number of optics. This is done because FUV reflection and transmission efficiencies are typically quite low compared to what is common at visible wavelengths. In accomplishing this, the COS FUV channel uses a single (selectable) optic to diffract the light from HST, correct for the Hubble spherical aberration, focus the diffracted light onto the FUV detector and correct for astigmatism typical of this sort of instrument. Since aberration correction is performed after the light passes into the instrument, the entrance to the spectrograph must be an extended aperture, rather than the traditional narrow entrance slit, in order to allow the entire aberrated HST image from a point source to enter the instrument. The 2.5 arc second diameter entrance aperture allows ≈ 95% of the light from compact sources to enter COS, yielding high sensitivity at the design resolution for compact sources.

Table 1. Principal COS Spectrographic and Target Acquisition Modes
Grating (Channel)	Approximate Useful Wavelength Range	Resolving power (λ/Δλ)
G130M (FUV)	90–145 nm	16,000–21,000
G160M (FUV)	141–178 nm	16,000–21,000
G140L (FUV)	<90–205 nm	1,500–4,000
G185M (NUV)	170–210 nm	22,000–28,000
G225M (NUV)	210–250 nm	28,000–38,000
G285M (NUV)	250–320 nm	30,000–41,000
G230L (NUV)	170–320 nm	2,100–3,900
TA1 (target acquisition imager)	170–320 nm	~0.05 arc sec. angular resolution

Post launch performance closely matched expectations. Instrument sensitivity is close to pre-launch calibration values, and detector background is exceptionally low (0.16 counts per resolution element per 1000 seconds for the FUV detector, and 1.7 counts per resolution element per 100 seconds for the NUV detector). FUV resolution is slightly lower than pre-launch predictions due to mid-frequency polishing errors on the HST primary mirror, while NUV resolution exceeds pre-launch values in all modes. Thanks to the minimal number of reflections, the G140L mode, and G130M central wavelength settings added after 2010, can observe light at wavelengths down to ~90 nm, and shorter, despite the very low reflectivity of the MgF_{2} coated optics at these wavelengths.

== Science goals ==
The Cosmic Origins Spectrograph is designed to enable the observation of faint, point-like UV targets at moderate spectral resolution, allowing COS to observe hot stars (OB stars, white dwarfs, cataclysmic variables and binary stars) in the Milky Way and to observe the absorption features in the spectra of active galactic nuclei. Observations are also planned of extended objects. Spectroscopy provides a wealth of information about distant astronomical objects that is unobtainable through imaging:

Spectroscopy lies at the heart of astrophysical inference. Our understanding of the origin and evolution of the cosmos critically depends on our ability to make quantitative measurements of physical parameters such as the total mass, distribution, motions, temperatures, and composition of matter in the Universe. Detailed information on all of these properties can be gleaned from high-quality spectroscopic data. For distant objects, some of these properties (e.g., motions and composition) can only be measured through spectroscopy.

Ultraviolet (UV) spectroscopy provides some of the most fundamental diagnostic data necessary for discerning the physical characteristics of planets, stars, galaxies, and interstellar and intergalactic matter. The UV offers access to spectral features that provide key diagnostic information that cannot be obtained at other wavelengths.

Obtaining absorption spectra of interstellar and intergalactic gas forms the basis of many of the COS science programs. These spectra will address questions such as how was the Cosmic Web formed, how much mass can be found in interstellar and intergalactic gas, and what is the composition, distribution and temperature of this gas. In general, COS will address questions such as:

- What is the large-scale structure of matter in the Universe?
- How did galaxies form out of the intergalactic medium?
- What types of galactic halos and outflowing winds do star-forming galaxies produce?
- How were the chemical elements for life created in massive stars and supernovae?
- How do stars and planetary systems form from dust grains in molecular clouds?
- What is the composition of planetary atmospheres and comets in the Solar System (and beyond)?

Some specific programs include the following:

Large-Scale Structure of Baryonic Matter: With its high FUV spectroscopic sensitivity, COS uniquely suited for exploring the Lyman-alpha forest. This is the ‘forest’ of absorption spectra seen in the spectra of distant galaxies and quasars caused by intergalactic gas clouds, which may contain the majority of baryonic matter in the universe. Because the most useful absorption lines for these observations are in the far ultraviolet and the sources are faint, a high sensitivity FUV spectrograph with wide wavelength coverage is needed to perform these observations. By determining the redshift and line width of the intervening absorbers, COS will be able to map out the temperature, density and composition of dark baryonic matter in the Cosmic Web.

Warm–hot intergalactic medium: Absorption line studies of highly ionized (hot) gas (O IV, N V, etc.) and broad Lyman-alpha will explore the ionization state and distribution of hot intergalactic gas.

Great Wall Structure: Background active galactic nuclei will be used to study intergalactic absorbers to estimate their transverse size and physical density and determine how the distribution of material correlates with nearby galaxy distributions in the CFA2 Great Wall.

He II Reionization: Highly redshifted ionized helium will be used study the reionization process at a redshift (z) of ≈ 3.

== Additional instrument design details ==
COS has two channels, the Far Ultraviolet (FUV) covering 90–205 nm and the Near Ultraviolet (NUV) covering 170–320 nm. All COS optics are reflective (except for the bright object aperture filter and NUV order sorters) to maximize efficiency and to avoid chromatic aberration. Principal COS observing modes are summarized in table 1.

Light from the Hubble Space Telescope enters the instrument through either the Primary Science Aperture (PSA) or the Bright Object Aperture (BOA). The BOA introduces a neutral density filter to the optical path that attenuates the light by approximately a factor of one hundred (five astronomical magnitudes). Both apertures are oversized (2.5 arc second clear aperture) permitting more than 95% of the light from a point source to enter the spectrograph.

After passing through the PSA or BOA the light travels to one of the optics on the first of two optic select wheels, either one of the three FUV diffraction gratings or the first of the NUV collimation mirrors (table 1), depending on whether an FUV, NUV, or target acquisition channel is selected. All optics on the first wheel have an aspheric profile to correct for the Hubble spherical aberration.

The FUV channel has two medium and one low resolution spectroscopy modes. The FUV channels are modified Rowland Circle spectrographs in which the single holographically ruled aspheric concave diffraction grating simultaneously focuses and diffracts the incoming light and corrects both for the HST spherical aberration and for aberrations introduced by the extreme off-Rowland layout. The diffracted light is focused onto a 170x10 mm cross delay line microchannel plate detector. The FUV detector active area is curved to match the spectrograph's focal surface and is divided into two physically distinct segments separated by a small gap.

The NUV channel has three medium and one low resolution spectroscopy modes as well as an imaging mode with an approximately 1.0 arc second unvignetted field of view. The NUV channels utilize a modified Czerny-Turner design in which collimated light is fed to the selected grating, followed by three camera mirrors that direct the diffracted light onto three separate stripes on a 25×25 mm Multi Anode Microchannel Array (MAMA) detector. The imaging mode is primarily intended for target acquisition.

== See also ==
- Advanced Camera for Surveys
- Faint Object Camera
- Faint Object Spectrograph
- Goddard High Resolution Spectrograph
- Near Infrared Camera and Multi-Object Spectrometer
- Space Telescope Imaging Spectrograph
- Wide Field and Planetary Camera
- Wide Field and Planetary Camera 2
- Wide Field Camera 3
- Photon underproduction crisis
