= Bruce Woodgate =

American aerospace engineer, inventor and astronomer (1939–2014)

Bruce E. Woodgate (1939 – April 28, 2014) was a British-born American aerospace engineer, inventor and astronomer, who worked at NASA's Goddard Space Flight Center for forty years. He was the principal investigator of the Space Telescope Imaging Spectrograph (STIS), a spectrograph and camera which was installed on the Hubble Space Telescope in 1997. Woodgate oversaw the design, development and construction of the STIS. Astronomers and other scientists have used the STIS to study and measure a wide range of light wavelengths in deep space. Woodgate's invention has been called a "game changer" in the field of astronomy, allowing scientists to discover an "invisible high-speed collision" near SN 1987A, as well as new planets and black holes. A power failure knocked STIS offline in 2004, but it was repaired in 2009.

Aside his from his work as the principal investigator on STIS, Woodgate had also begun development on a new UV detector which counts protons utilizing new nano-fabrication technologies. He was active in several new technologies such as photon-counting electron multiplying CCDs and integral field spectrographs designed for the direct detection of habitable exoplanets. He was honored with the NASA Distinguished Service Medal and the Award of Merit from the Goddard Space Flight Center. In addition to Goddard research, he was an avid sailor and an instructor in the Goddard Sailing Association.

Woodgate was born and raised in Eastbourne, East Sussex, England. He lived in a home on St. Anthony's Avenue in Eastbourne as a child and attended Eastbourne Grammar School. He began his career in astronomy and engineering at the Royal Greenwich Observatory, which was located at Herstmonceux Castle at the time. Woodgate then moved to London, where he earned a doctorate from University College London. He moved to the United States, where he held positions at Columbia University's Goddard Institute for Space Studies. In 1975, Woodgate joined the staff of NASA's Goddard Space Flight Center, where he worked for the rest of his career.

Bruce Woodgate died on April 28, 2014, from complications from a series of strokes suffered during the previous month. He was 75 years old.
