= Spectral resolution =

Resolving power of a spectrograph

The spectral resolution of a spectrograph, or, more generally, of a frequency spectrum, is a measure of its ability to resolve features in the electromagnetic spectrum. It is usually denoted by $\Delta\lambda$, and is closely related to the resolving power of the spectrograph, defined as
$$R = \frac{\lambda}{\Delta\lambda},$$
where $\Delta\lambda$ is the smallest difference in wavelengths that can be distinguished at a wavelength of $\lambda$. For example, the Space Telescope Imaging Spectrograph (STIS) can distinguish features 0.17 nm apart at a wavelength of 1000 nm, giving it a resolution of 0.17 nm and a resolving power of about 5,900. An example of a high resolution spectrograph is the Cryogenic High-Resolution IR Echelle Spectrograph (CRIRES+) installed at ESO's Very Large Telescope, which has a spectral resolving power of up to 100,000.

== Doppler effect ==
The spectral resolution can also be expressed in terms of physical quantities, such as velocity; then it describes the difference between velocities $\Delta v$ that can be distinguished through the Doppler effect. Then, the resolution is $\Delta v$ and the resolving power is
$$R = \frac{c}{\Delta v},$$
where $c$ is the speed of light. The STIS example above then has a spectral resolution of 51.

== IUPAC definition ==
IUPAC defines resolution in optical spectroscopy as the minimum wavenumber, wavelength or frequency difference between two lines in a spectrum that can be distinguished. Resolving power, R, is given by the transition wavenumber, wavelength or frequency, divided by the resolution.

== See also ==
- Angular resolution
- Resolution (mass spectrometry)
