= High Speed Photometer =

Scientific instrument on the Hubble Space Telescope

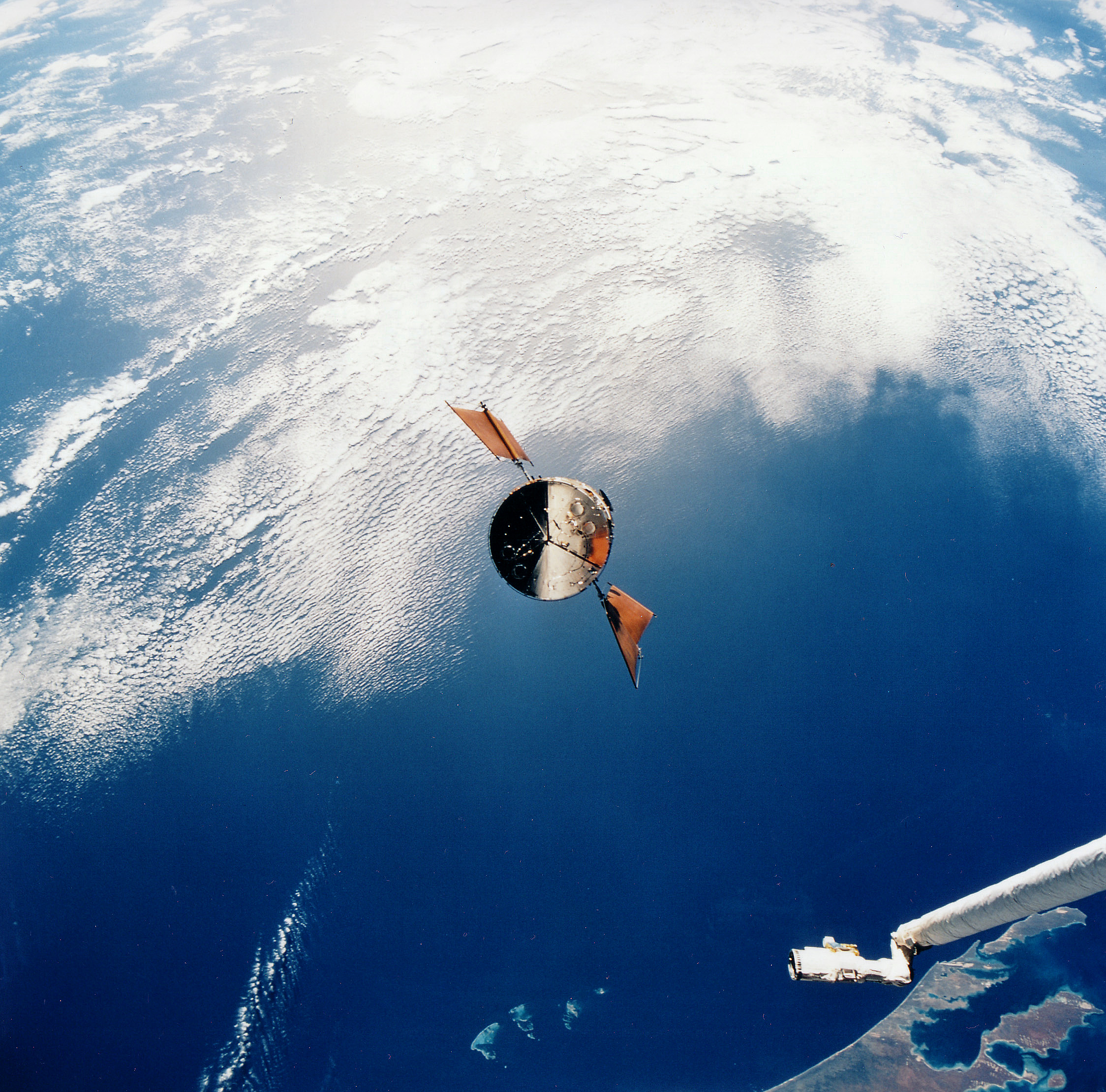
STS-61 rendezvous with Hubble Space Telescope to replace various items including the High Speed Photometer

The High Speed Photometer (HSP) is a scientific instrument formerly installed on the Hubble Space Telescope. The HSP was designed to measure the brightness and polarity of rapidly varying celestial objects. It could observe in ultraviolet, visible light, and near infrared at a rate of one measurement per 10 microseconds. The design was novel in that despite being able to view through a variety of filters and apertures, it had no moving parts "except for electrons" as principal investigator Prof. Robert Bless was fond of saying. Filter and aperture selection was accomplished using image dissector tubes and the HST pointing system. It was functional from launch in 1990 until it was removed at the end of 1993, and it helped diagnose an issue with the Hubble's primary mirror.

The HSP was one of the instruments on Hubble at launch. Its primary mission was compromised by the optical problems with the telescope, although some projects were still successful. During the first servicing mission, in December 1993, it was replaced by the Corrective Optics Space Telescope Axial Replacement (COSTAR), which corrected the optical problem for the remaining instruments.

The principal investigator for the instrument was Dr. Robert C. Bless. Dr. Bless died in 2015, and his contributions to the Hubble Space Telescope and the HSP instrument were noted in news media. He worked at the University of Wisconsin–Madison, and the HSP was the lightest and least expensive of the launch instruments.

The HSP instrument is located as of 2015 at the University of Wisconsin-Madison's Space Place.

It was scientifically active during its period of use, an example of observations taken with the instrument is ultraviolet photometry of Nova Cygni 1992.

== Specifications ==
- Wavelengths of light detected 115 nm to 870 nm
- Mass : 300 kg or 273 kg
- Fields of view 0.4, 1.0, and 10.8 arc-seconds (arc-seconds are unit of degree)
