= Fine guidance sensor =

Space telescope pointing device

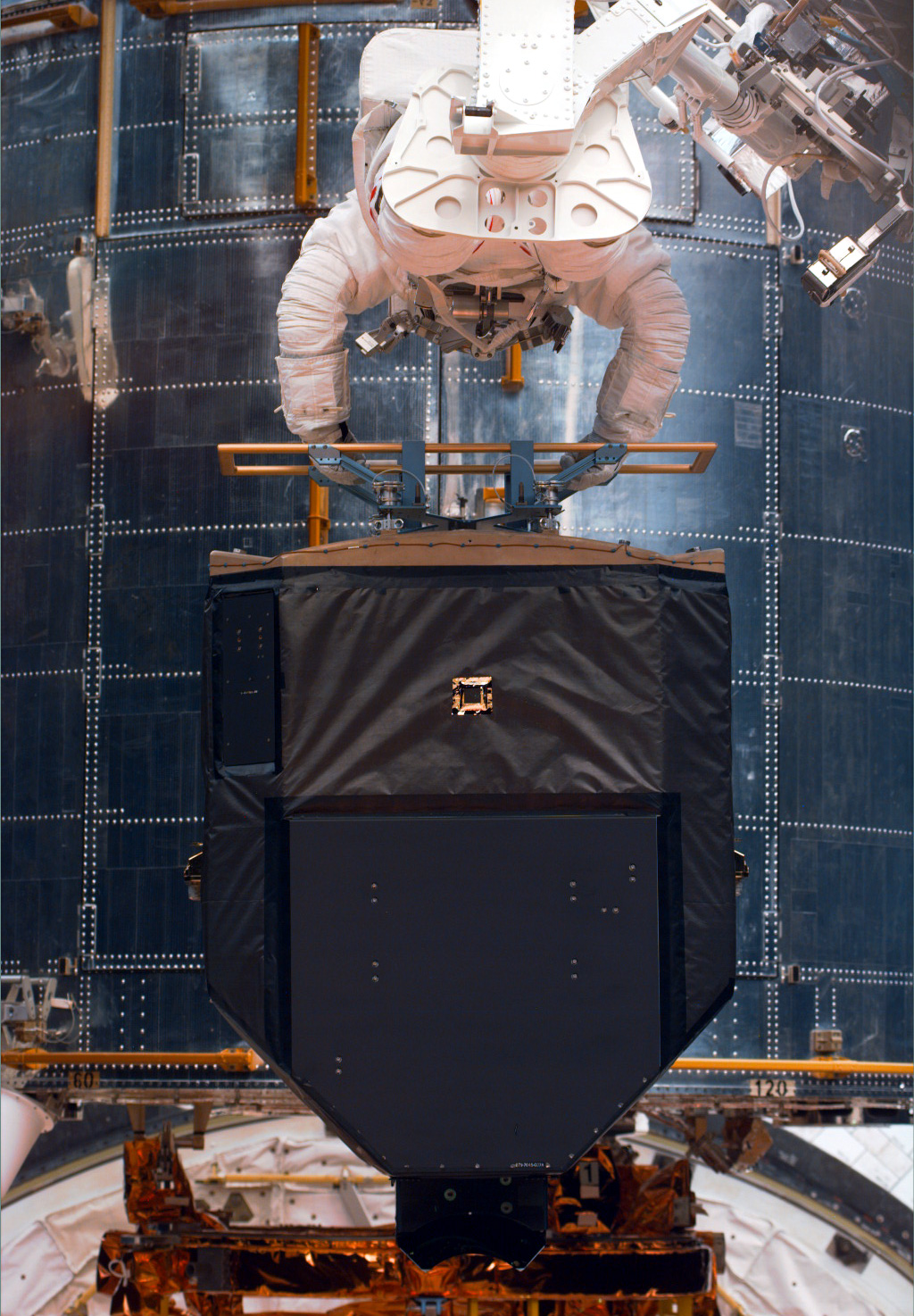
One of the three fine guidance sensors photographed during Servicing Mission 2 in 1997

A fine guidance sensor (FGS) is an instrument on board a space telescope that provides high-precision pointing information as input to the telescope's attitude control systems. Interferometric FGSs have been deployed on the Hubble Space Telescope; a different technical approach is used for the James Webb Space Telescope's FGSs. In some specialized cases, such as astrometry, FGSs can also be used as scientific instruments.

== Hubble Space Telescope FGS ==
The Hubble Space Telescope has three fine guidance sensors (FGSs). Two are used to point and lock the telescope onto the target, and the third can be used for position measurements – also known as astrometry. Because the FGSs are so accurate, they can be used to measure stellar distances and also to investigate binary star systems.

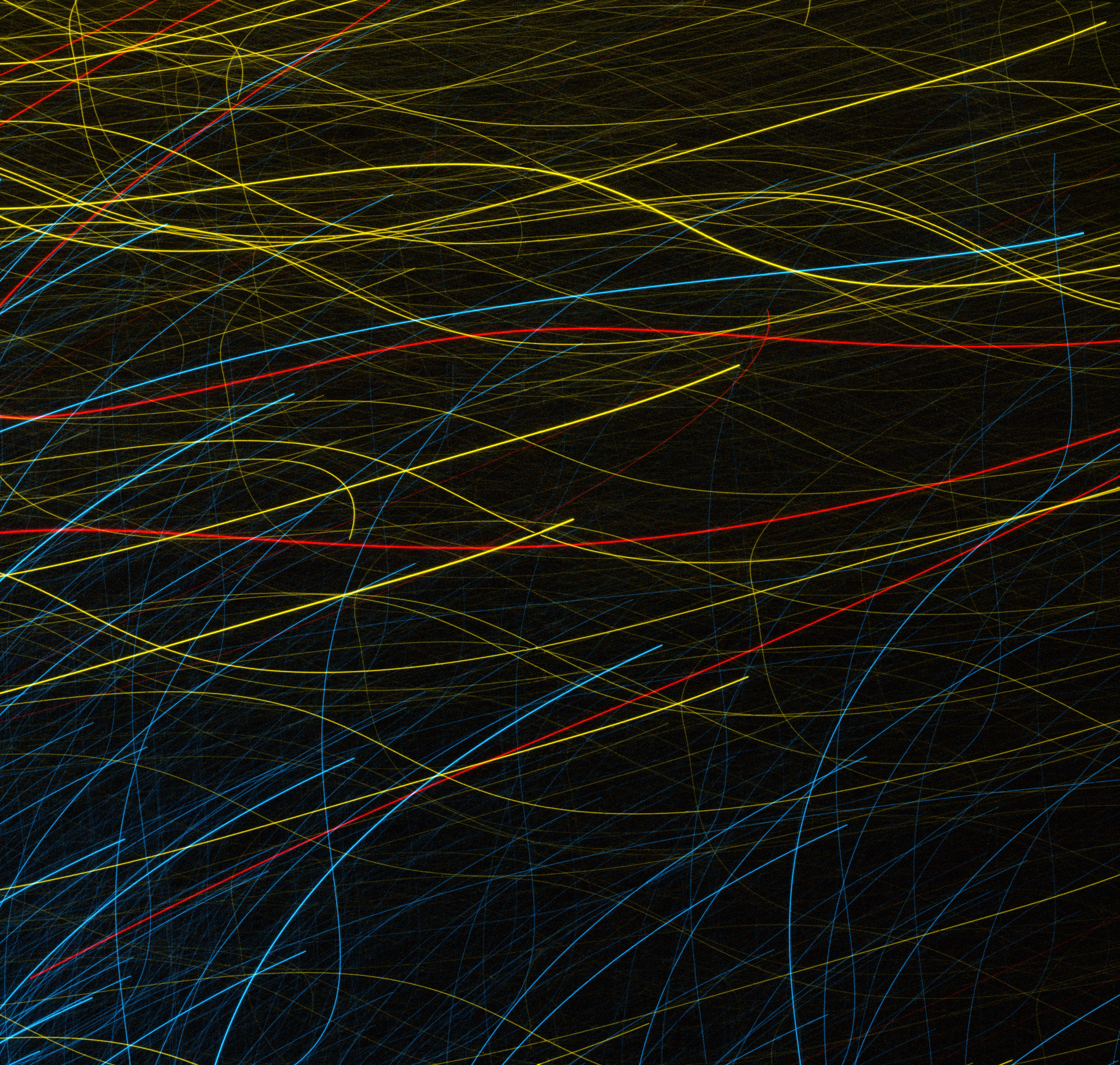
After locking on to a bad guide star, Hubble's tracking system captured this image: the prominent red streaks are actually stars in globular cluster NGC 288.

The three FGSs are located at 90-degree intervals around the circumference of the telescope's field of view. To achieve the very high pointing accuracy Hubble needs, the FGSs have been constructed as interferometers to exploit the wavelike features of the in-coming starlight. With this kind of accuracy and precision, the sensors can search for a wobble in the motion of nearby stars that could indicate the presence of a planetary companion, determine if certain stars really are double stars, measure the angular diameter of stars, galaxies, etc.

Due to the sensitivity of the FGS they can not be used whilst the HST is pointed within 50 degrees of the Sun.

== James Webb Space Telescope FGS ==
A guiding system, also called FGS, but using different technology is used for the James Webb Space Telescope (JWST). It provides input for the observatory's attitude control system (ACS). During in-orbit commissioning of the JWST, the FGS also provided pointing error signals during activities to achieve alignment and phasing of the segments of the deployable primary mirror.

The JWST FGS, designed and built by COM DEV International, was supplied by the Canadian Space Agency. To save on mass and volume it was assembled into a single unit together with the Near Infrared Imager and Slitless Spectrograph, but they are separate optical instruments.

Unlike the Hubble Space Telescope's field guidance sensors, which can be used in astrometry such as studying exoplanets, the James Webb Space Telescope's field guidance sensors are not available for science proposals by researchers because they are used exclusively for guiding and calibration.

=== JWST FGS functions ===
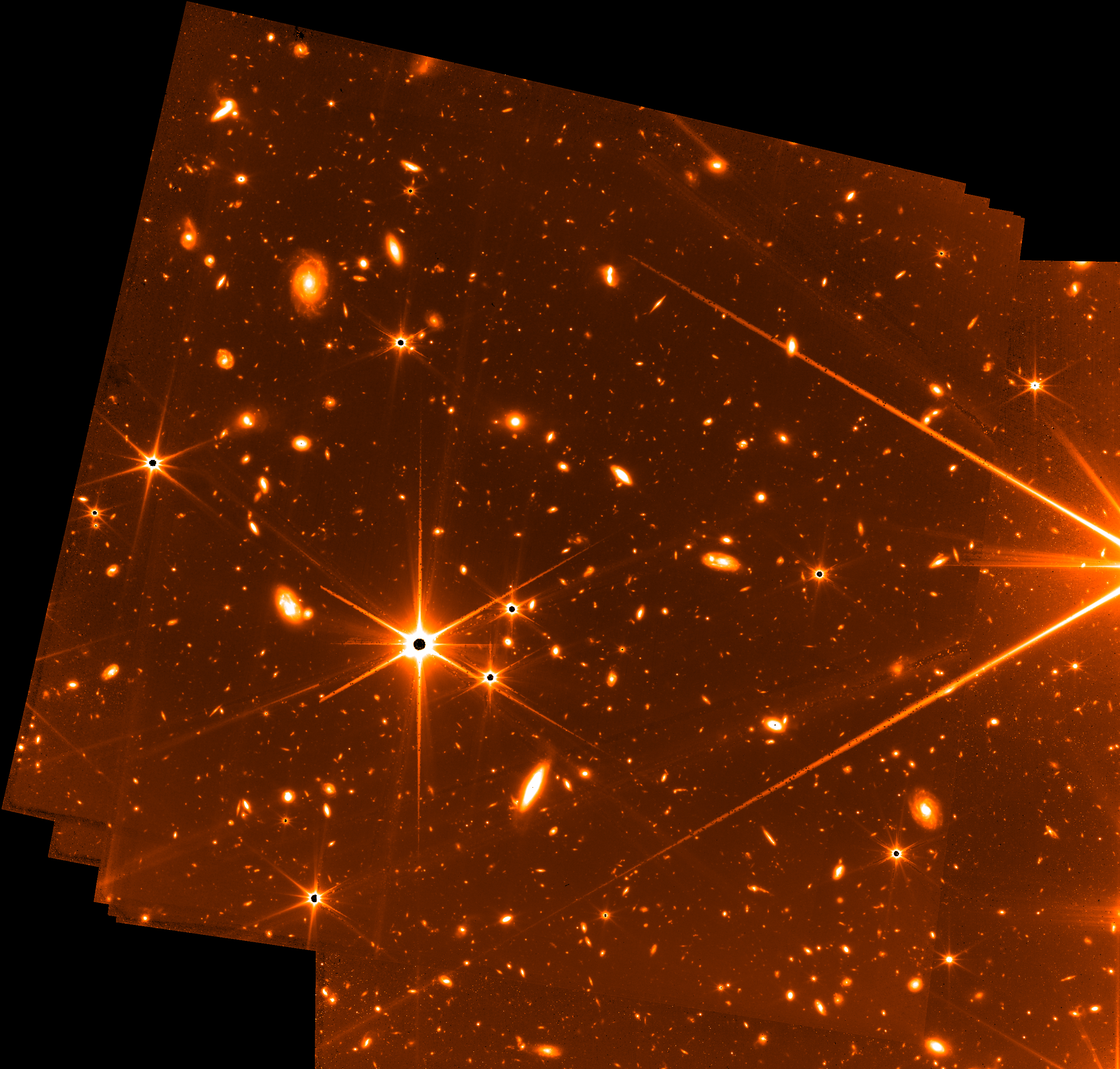
Image produced by the JWST FGS.

The JWST FGS-Guider has three main functions. The first is to obtain images for target acquisition. Full-frame images are used to identify star fields by correlating the observed brightness and position of sources with the properties of catalogued objects selected by the observation planning software. The second is to acquire pre-selected guide stars. During acquisition, a guide star is first centred in an 8 × 8 pixel window. Small angle maneuvers are then executed to translate this window to a pre-specified location within the field of view, so that an observation with one of the science instruments will be oriented correctly. The third function is to provide the ACS with centroid measurements of the guide stars at a rate of 16 times per second. These measurements will be used to enable stable pointing at the milliarcsecond level.

The FGS will be sensitive enough to reach 58 μJy at 1.25 μm (~Jab = 19.5), and has a 2.4×2.4 arcminute square field of view. This combination of sky coverage and sensitivity ensures that an appropriate guide star can be found with 95% probability at any point in the sky, including high galactic latitudes.

== See also ==
- Star tracker
