= Space Telescope Imaging Spectrograph =

Instrument on the Hubble Space Telescope

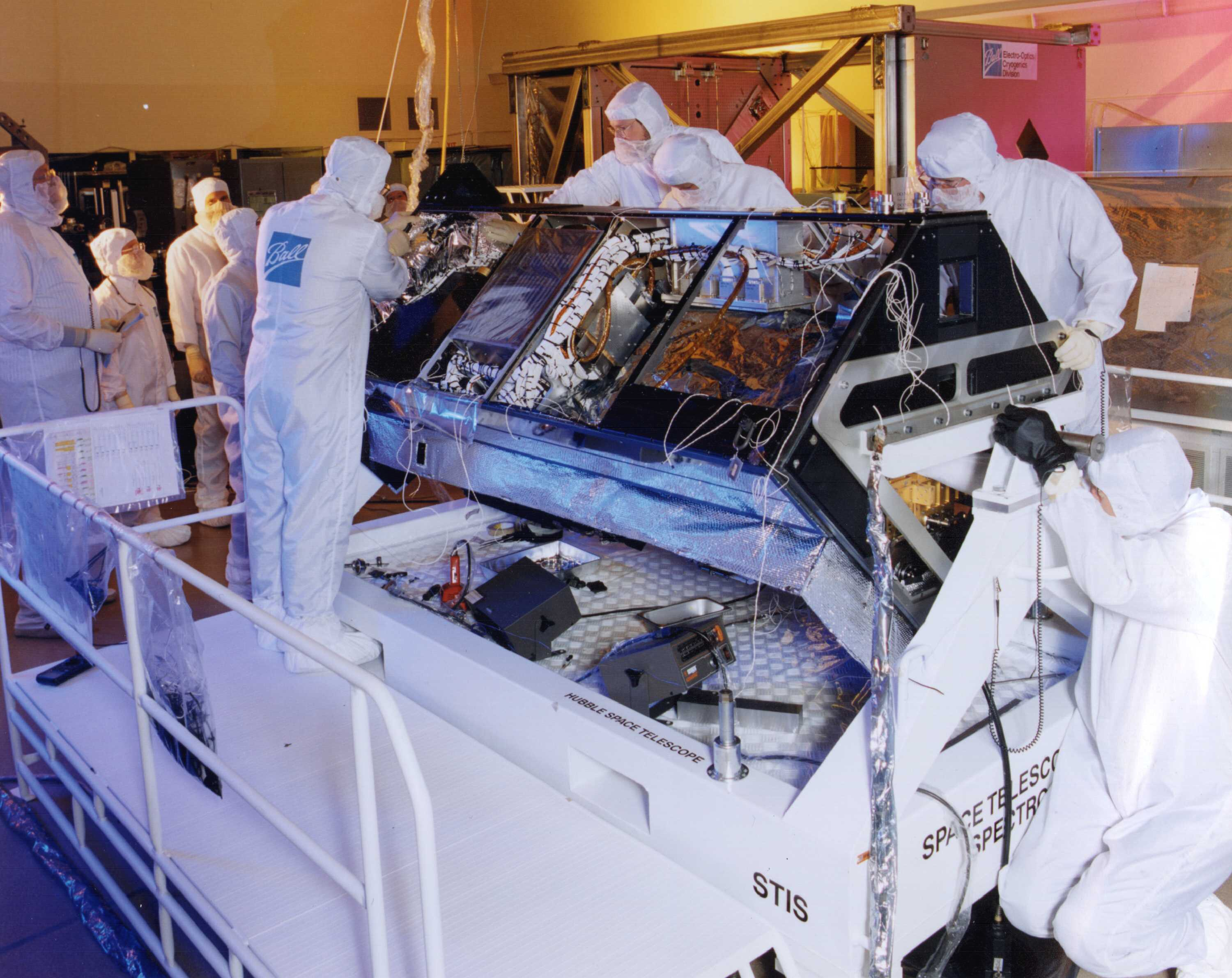
STIS under construction, 1996

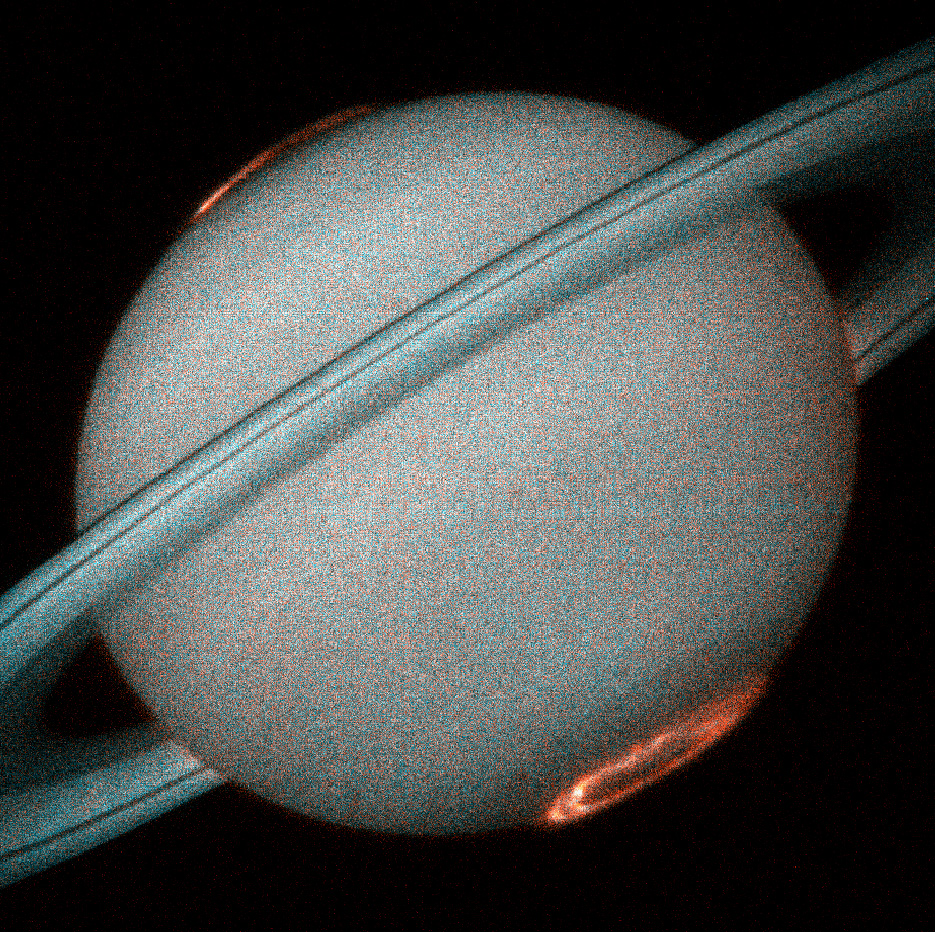
STIS camera images Saturn aurora

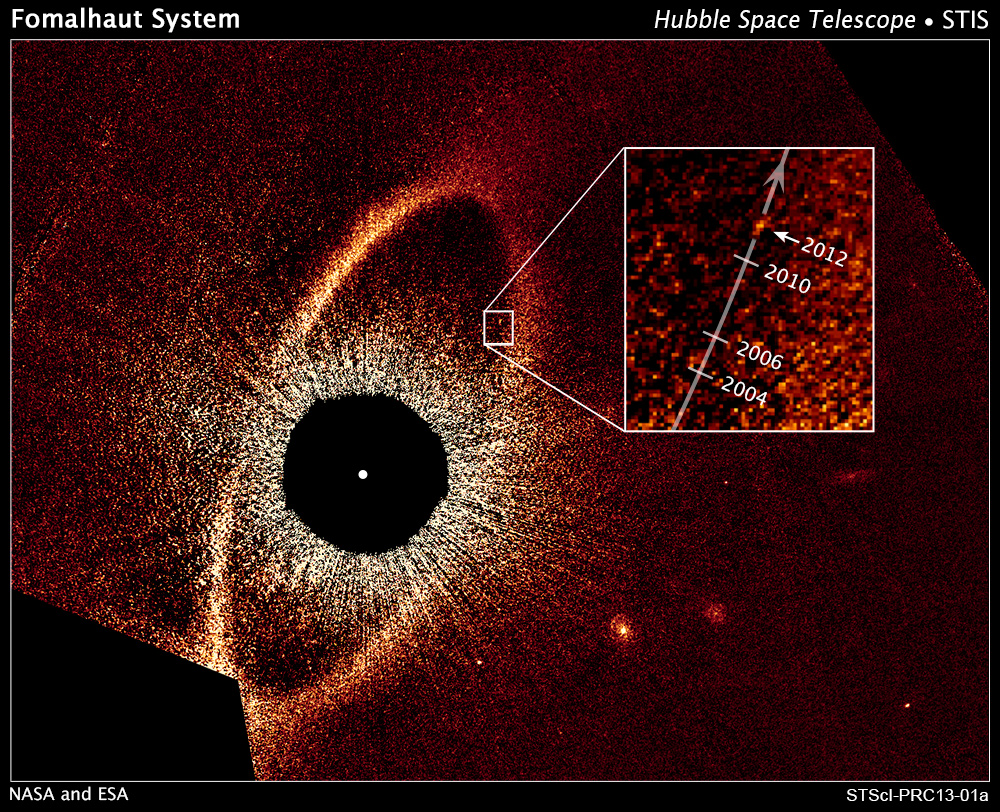
STIS images the Fomalhaut system (January 8, 2013) (NASA).

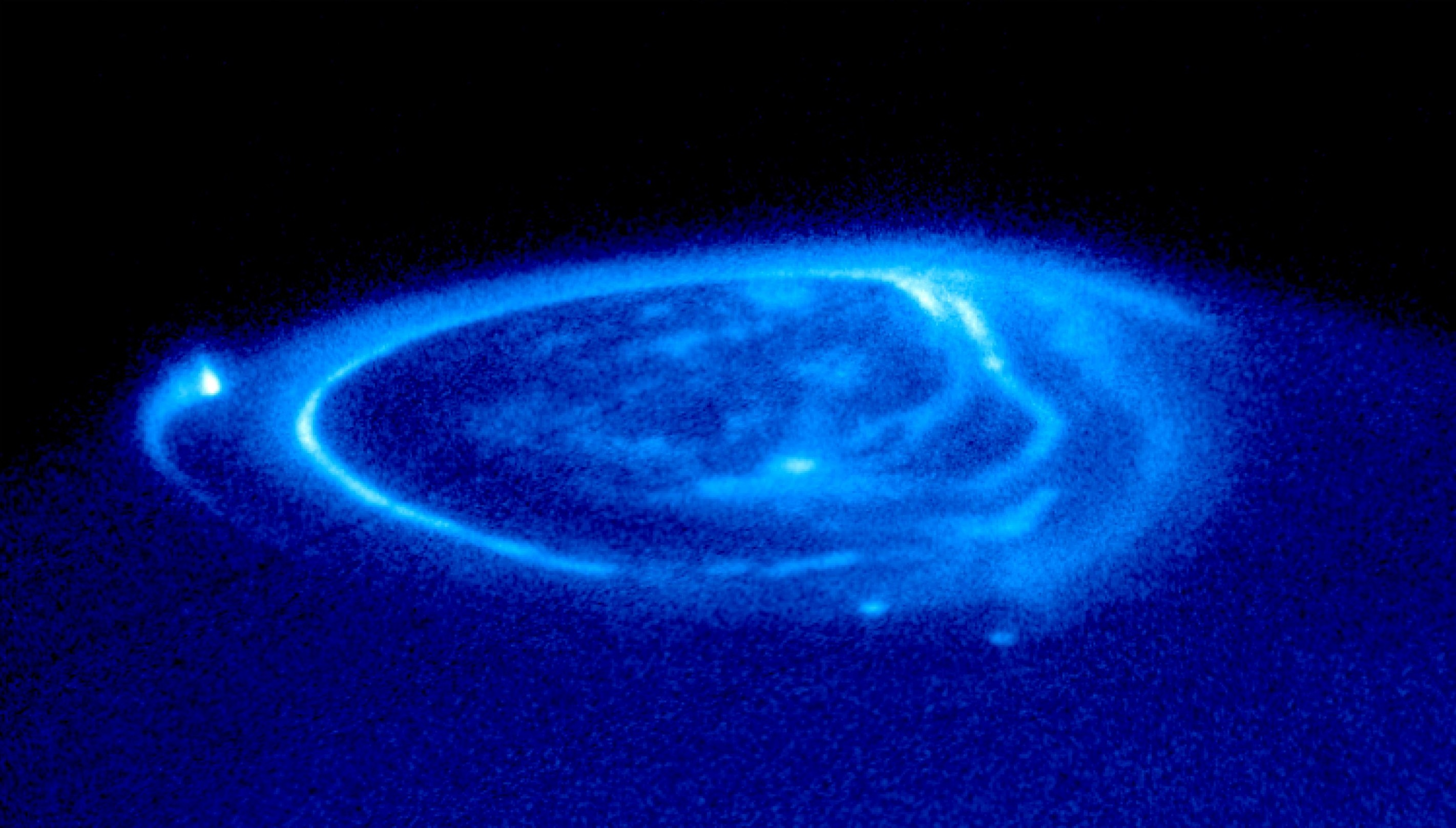
Ultraviolet image of Jupiter's aurora; the bright spot at far left is the end of field line to Io; spots at bottom lead to Ganymede and Europa.

The Space Telescope Imaging Spectrograph (STIS) is a spectrograph, also with a camera mode, installed on the Hubble Space Telescope. Aerospace engineer Bruce Woodgate of the Goddard Space Flight Center was the principal investigator and creator of the STIS. It operated continuously from 1997 until a power supply failure in August 2004. After repairs, it began operating again in 2009. The spectrograph has made many important observations, including the first spectrum of the atmosphere of an extrasolar planet, HD 209458b.

The STIS was installed on Hubble in 1997 during its second servicing mission (STS-82) by Mark Lee and Steven Smith, replacing the High Resolution Spectrograph and the Faint Object Spectrograph. It was designed to operate for five years. On August 3, 2004, an electronic failure rendered STIS inoperable, ending its use 2 years beyond its predicted lifespan. In order to bring it back to operational status, the instrument was repaired by space shuttle astronauts during STS-125, Servicing Mission 4, launched on May 11, 2009. The crew did a long (many hour) EVA to repair the instrument.

Congratulations, you brought STIS back to life.

— Astronaut J. Grunsfield, 2009

== Design ==
STIS is both a spectrograph and an imaging camera, and is focused on ultraviolet light.

The STIS has three 1024×1024 detector arrays. The first is a charge-coupled device with a 52×52 arc-second field of view, covering the visible and near-infrared spectrum from 200 nm to 1030 nm.

The other two detectors are Multi-Anode Multichannel Arrays, each with a 25×25 arc-second field of view. One is Cs_{2}Te, and covers the near-UV between 160 nm and 310 nm. The other is CsI and covers the far-UV between 115 nm and 170 nm.

== Timeline ==
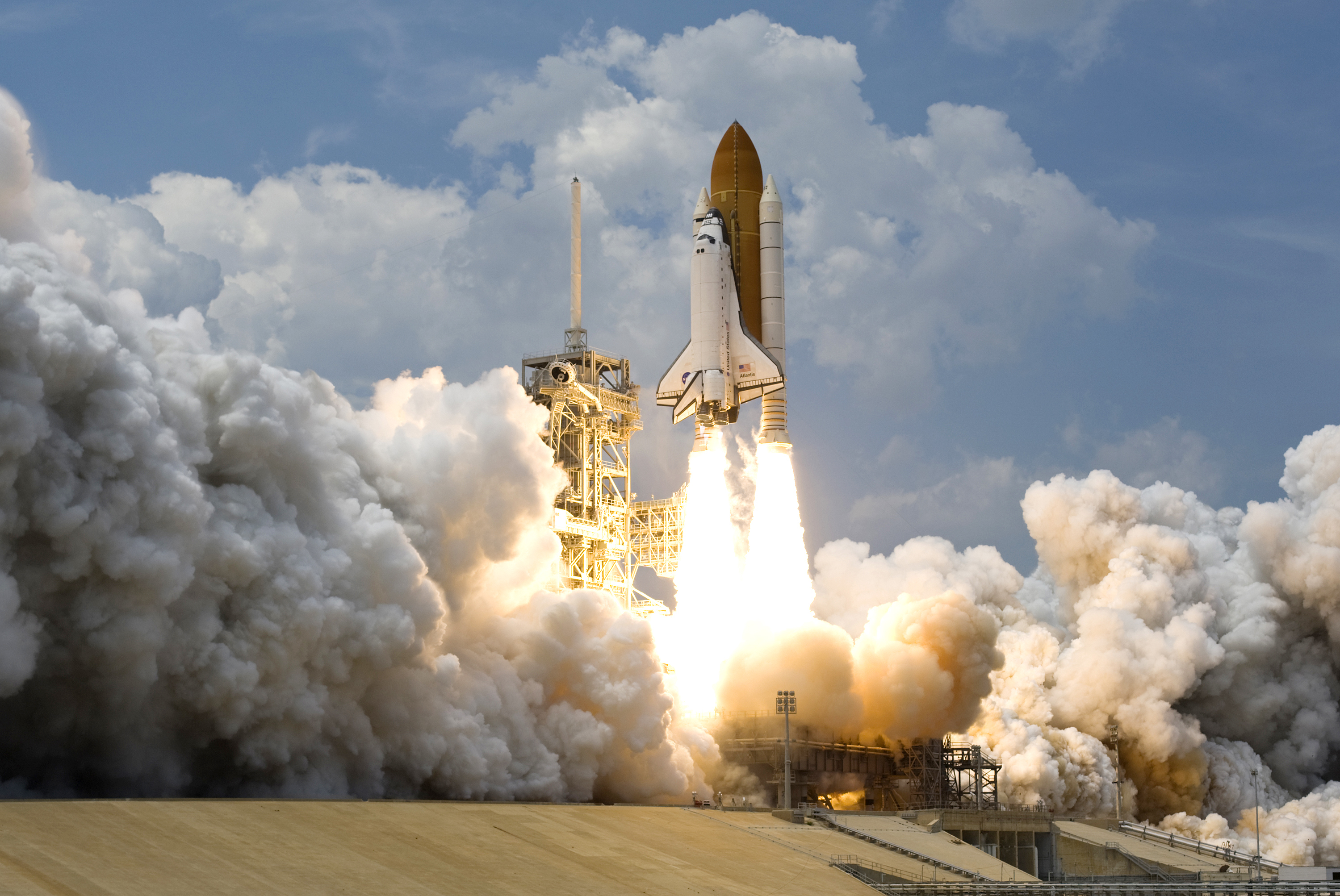
STS-125 launches, a Space Shuttle Atlantis mission that repaired STIS and returned it to service

- February 14, 1997 – STIS installed (STS-82)
- 2001 – Switches to Side-2 electronics after a failure in side-1.
- August 3, 2004 – STIS goes offline due to side-2 power-failure
- 2009 – STIS repaired (STS-125)
- As of 2026 Operating on side-2 electronics with all optical and UV channels.

== Selected discoveries and observations ==
On its 20th anniversary (1997–2017) NASA noted a selection of discoveries and/or observations conducted with STIS:

- Survey of 20 galaxies to look for black holes
- Study of the Intergalactic Medium
- Study of the Galactic Halo
- Study of Interstellar Medium
- Chemical analysis of an atmosphere of an exoplanet
- Observations of a Dust Disk around Beta Pictoris
- Study of massive stars in R136 (in the Tarantula Nebula)
- Study of the star Eta Carinae
- Study of Supernova 1987A
- Study of flows from an Active Galaxy

== See also ==
Other Hubble instruments :

- Advanced Camera for Surveys
- Cosmic Origins Spectrograph
- Faint Object Camera
- Faint Object Spectrograph
- Goddard High Resolution Spectrograph
- Near Infrared Camera and Multi-Object Spectrometer
- Wide Field and Planetary Camera
- Wide Field and Planetary Camera 2
- Wide Field Camera 3
