= Goddard High Resolution Spectrograph =

Former spectrograph on the Hubble Space Telescope

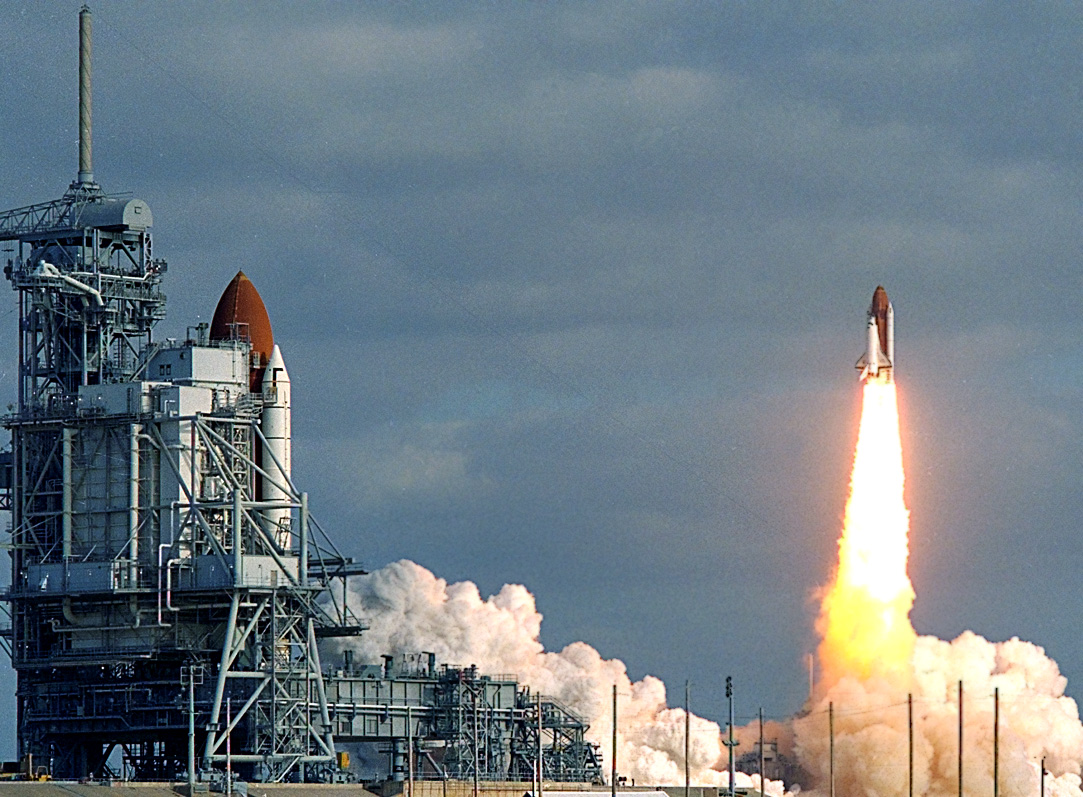
Space Shuttle Discovery heads into orbit during its 1990 STS-31 mission with the Hubble Space Telescope and its original instrument suite, including the High Resolution Spectrograph.

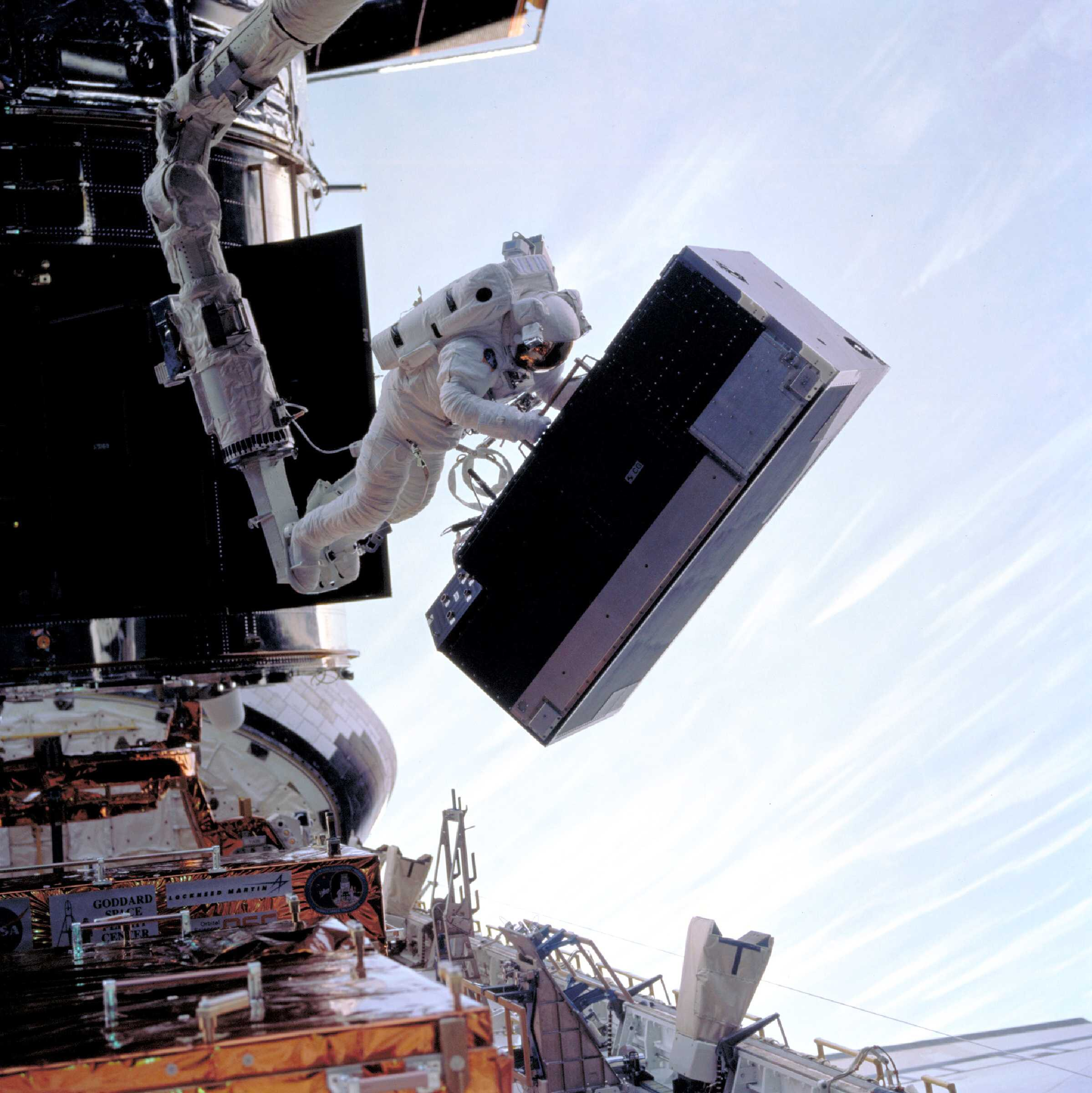
GHRS being removed during Servicing Mission 2. (1997)

The Goddard High Resolution Spectrograph (GHRS or HRS) was an ultraviolet spectrograph installed on the Hubble Space Telescope during its original construction, and it was launched into space as part of that space telescope aboard the Space Shuttle Discovery on April 24, 1990 (STS-31). The instrument is named after 20th century rocket pioneer Robert H. Goddard.

One of the results was the discovery of tenuous atmosphere for Jupiter's moon Europa in 1995. The gas was determined to be mostly of molecular oxygen (O_{2}). The surface pressure of Europa's atmosphere is 0.1 μPa, or 10^{−12} times that of the Earth.

An example GHRS use was to observe the local interstellar medium in the direction towards Capella.

The Goddard High Resolution Spectrograph was removed from the Hubble Space Telescope during the February, 1997, Space Shuttle Discovery mission STS-82 (also called SM-2 for Servicing Mission 2). It, and the Faint Object Spectrograph, were replaced by two new instruments installed during the mission, the Near Infrared Camera and Multi-Object Spectrometer (NICMOS) and the Space Telescope Imaging Spectrograph.

== Instrument details ==
- Instrument type: Ultraviolet spectrograph
- Wavelength range: 1150 to 3200 Å (105 to 320 nm)
- Resolving power
  - Low - 2,000
  - Medium - 25,000
  - High - 80,000

A technical description of the construction and operation of the GHRS can be found in the GHRS instrument handbook.
