= Faint Object Spectrograph =

Former instrument on the Hubble Space Telescope

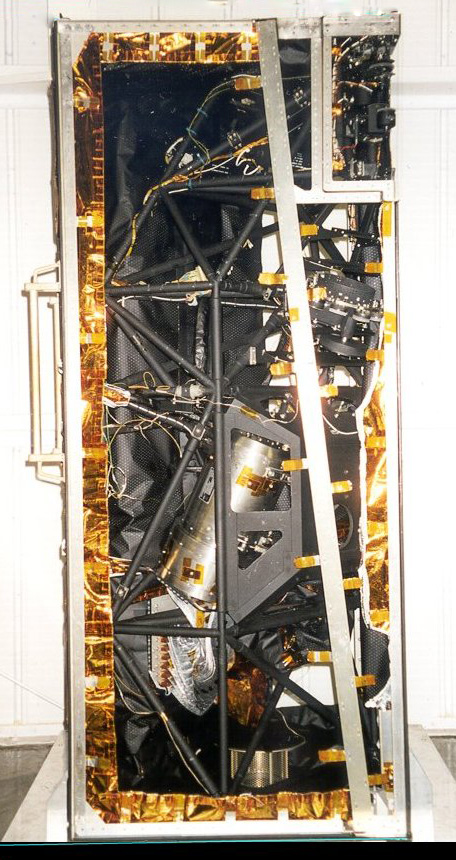
The Faint Object Spectrograph (FOS). This picture was taken after FOS was brought back to the Earth again. Credit: NASA/ESA.

The Faint Object Spectrograph (FOS) was a spectrograph installed on the Hubble Space Telescope. It was replaced by the Space Telescope Imaging Spectrograph in 1997, and is now on display in the National Air and Space Museum in Washington DC.

== FOS facts ==
- Instrument type: Spectrograph
- Wavelength range: 115 to 850 nm

A technical description of the construction and operation of the FOS can be found in NASA technical report CP-2244. The instrument used two digicon detectors, 'blue' and 'red', and had a spectral resolution of about 1300 over the 115 nm to 850 nm range. It had a number of apertures of varying size, but the aberration of the HST mirror meant that, until COSTAR was installed, the smallest apertures suffered very serious loss of light; even the largest 4.3-arcsecond aperture collected only 70% of the light from a point source.

The digicons suffered from inadequate magnetic shielding, which meant that a static image was smeared over several pixels; the red digicon suffered most from this. Also, either the blue detector or one of the mirrors in the system was contaminated in such a way as to remove sensitivity below 150 nm; this was a serious problem since it makes the Lyman-alpha line at 121.6 nm inaccessible.
