= SDSS J110012.38+084616.3 =

Type 2 quasar located in the constellation of Leo

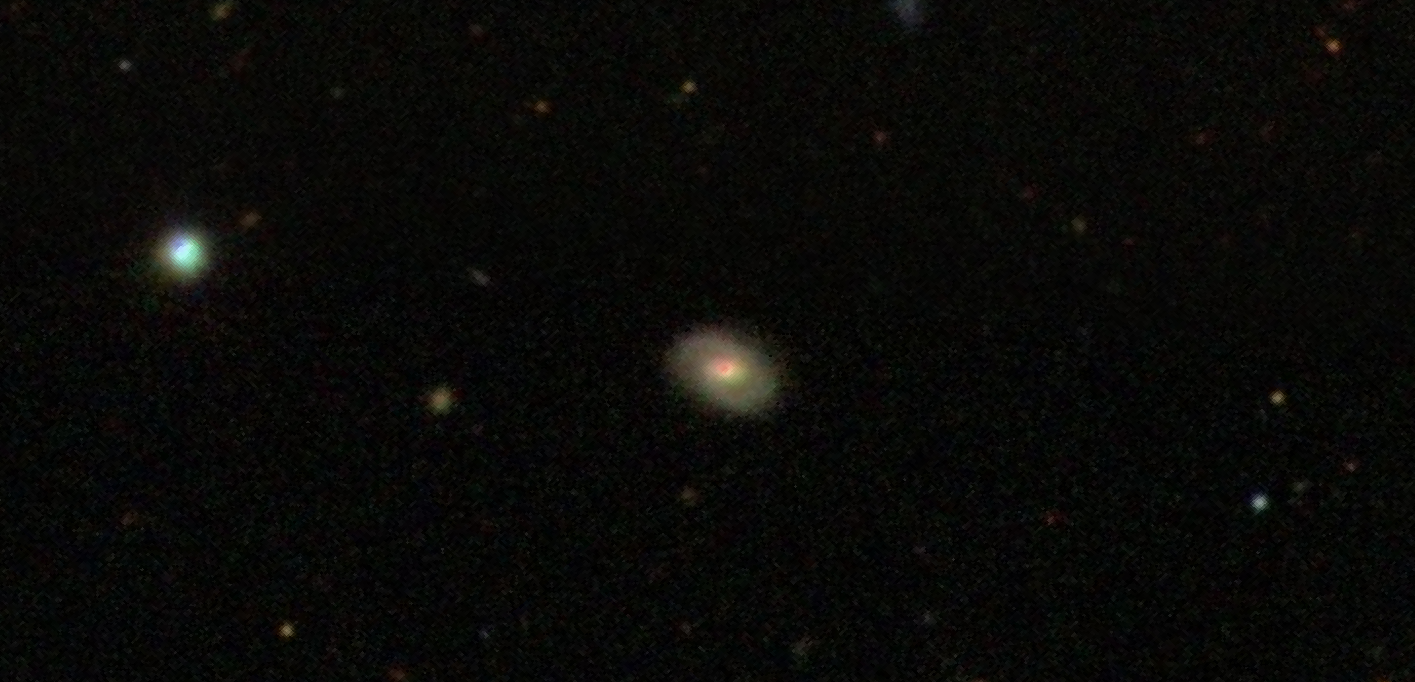
- The type 2 quasar SDSS J110012.38+084616.3

Observation data (J2000.0 epoch)
- Constellation: Leo
- Right ascension: 11^{h} 00^{m} 12.38^{s}
- Declination: +08° 46′ 16.33″
- Redshift: 0.100432
- Heliocentric radial velocity: 30,109 km/s
- Distance: 1.366 Gly
- Apparent magnitude (V): 17.38

Characteristics
- Type: QSO2
- Size: ~213,000 ly (65.4 kpc) (estimated)

Other designations
- 2MASX J11001238+0846157, NVSS J110012+084616, LEDA 3469502, LAMOST J110012.39+084616.3

SDSS J110012.38+084616.3 known as J1100+0846, is a type 2 quasar located in the constellation of Leo. The redshift of the object is (z) 0.1004 and it was first discovered by astronomers in March 2009 through an infrared photometric study. It is classified as radio-quiet.

== Description ==
SDSS J110012.38+084616.3 is classified as a large moderately inclined type SBb barred spiral galaxy with an undisturbed appearance based on it showing no evidence of any galaxy mergers and a total star formation rate estimating to be 34 M_{☉} per year. There are presence of spiral arms in the galaxy with carbon monoxide (CO) mapping describing the first arm as having a negative velocity on the western bar edge and a positive velocity on the second arm on the eastern bar edge. A large region of molecular gas is found in the galaxy according to imaging made with Atacama Large Millimeter Array.

The doubly ionized oxygen [O III] emission appears to be very compact when imaged with Advanced Camera for Surveys instrument abroad the Hubble Space Telescope. Based on imaging, it has a near circular appearance and a small tail slightly extended towards the south-east direction. In its nucleus, there is radio emission blueshifted to southeast with a full width at half maximum velocity of 1000 kilometers per seconds. Disturbed kinematics can be seen extending northwest from the nucleus to single-component emission lines. The radio morphology of the galaxy can be classified as having an irregular radio features with nuclear components either being dominated by its jet, lobe or by wind, and a linear size of 0.8 kiloparsec. The kinetic power of the jet is estimated to be 8.3^{+2.5}_{−2} × 10^{43} erg s^{−1}.

A study made in 2024, has shown the nuclear radio emission is elongating towards the direction that is consistent with its radio structure. Observations also showed there is presence of hydrogen-alpha emission in the galaxy tracing both its disk and spiral arms. A moment 2 map found the velocity dispersion is mainly low in relation with the arms whereas the central region has a high turbulence of gas with velocity dispersions reaching upwards to 500 kilometers per seconds. Results also showed the total mass of the outflow in the galaxy is 6 M_{☉} per year with an outflow kinetic power of 1.8 ± 2.8 × 10^{42} erg s^{−1} and maximum outflow velocity of 977 ± 120 kilometers per seconds. In its emission line profiles, broad wings are present over the field of view with an extent of 9 x 6 kiloparsecs. Crystalline silicate features were also detected in weak radio emission of the galaxy's spectra at a 23 ɥm band by James Webb Space Telescope, suggesting the galaxy is moderately obscured.
