= NGC 1134 =

Spiral galaxy in the constellation Aries

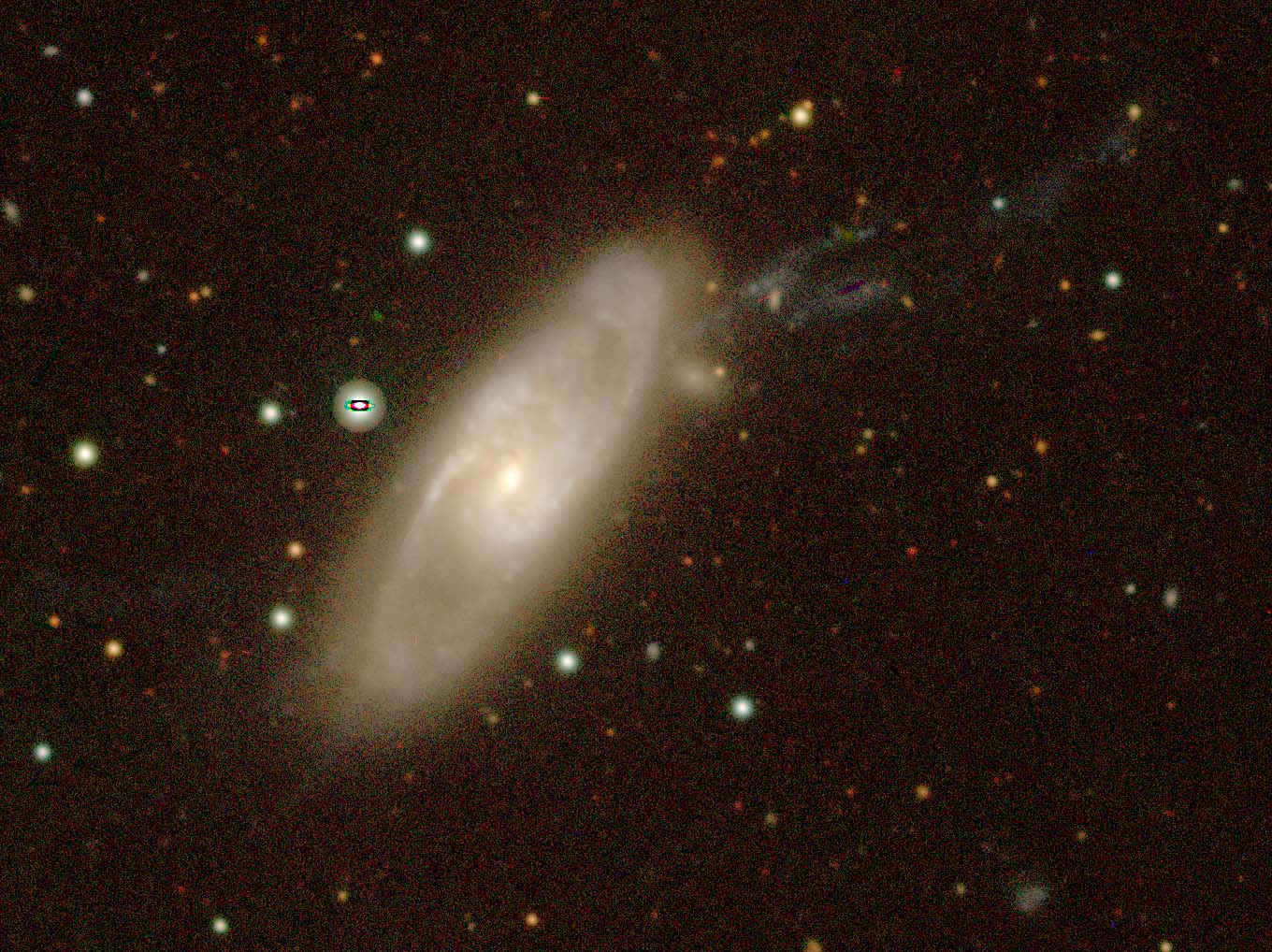
- NGC 1134 imaged by legacy surveys

Observation data (J2000 epoch)
- Constellation: Aries
- Right ascension: 02^{h} 53^{m} 41.341^{s}
- Declination: +13° 00′ 50.85″
- Redshift: 0.012178 ± 0.000010
- Heliocentric radial velocity: 3,640±1 km/s
- Distance: 114.7 Mly (35.16 Mpc)
- Apparent magnitude (V): 13.05

Characteristics
- Type: S
- Size: ~93,200 ly (28.58 kpc) (estimated)
- Apparent size (V): 1.467′ × 0.997′

Other designations
- BWE 0250+1248, UZC J025341.2+130053, IRAS 02509+1248, 2MASX J02534134+1300508, Arp 200, UGC 2365, LEDA 10928, MCG +02-08-027, PGC 10928, CGCG 440-027

NGC 1134 is a spiral galaxy in the constellation Aries. Its velocity with respect to the cosmic microwave background is 3,426±15 km/s, which corresponds to a Hubble distance of 164.8 ± 11.5 Mly (50.53 ± 3.54 Mpc). However, five non-redshift measurement gives a much closer distance of 116.31 ± 3.03 Mly (35.660 ± 0.929 Mpc). It was discovered by German-British astronomer William Herschel on 16 October 1784.

NGC 1134 has a highly inclined disk, with respect to the line of sight from Earth. There is a weak outer extension of the spiral structure in this galaxy. It has been listed in the Arp Atlas of Peculiar Galaxies (Arp number 200), under the "Galaxies with material ejected from nuclei" section. NGC 1134 is classified as a galaxy with reduced surface brightness, and it possesses a distinct bulge in its centre, as judged by photometric analysis. It has a small and distant companion about 7' to the south.

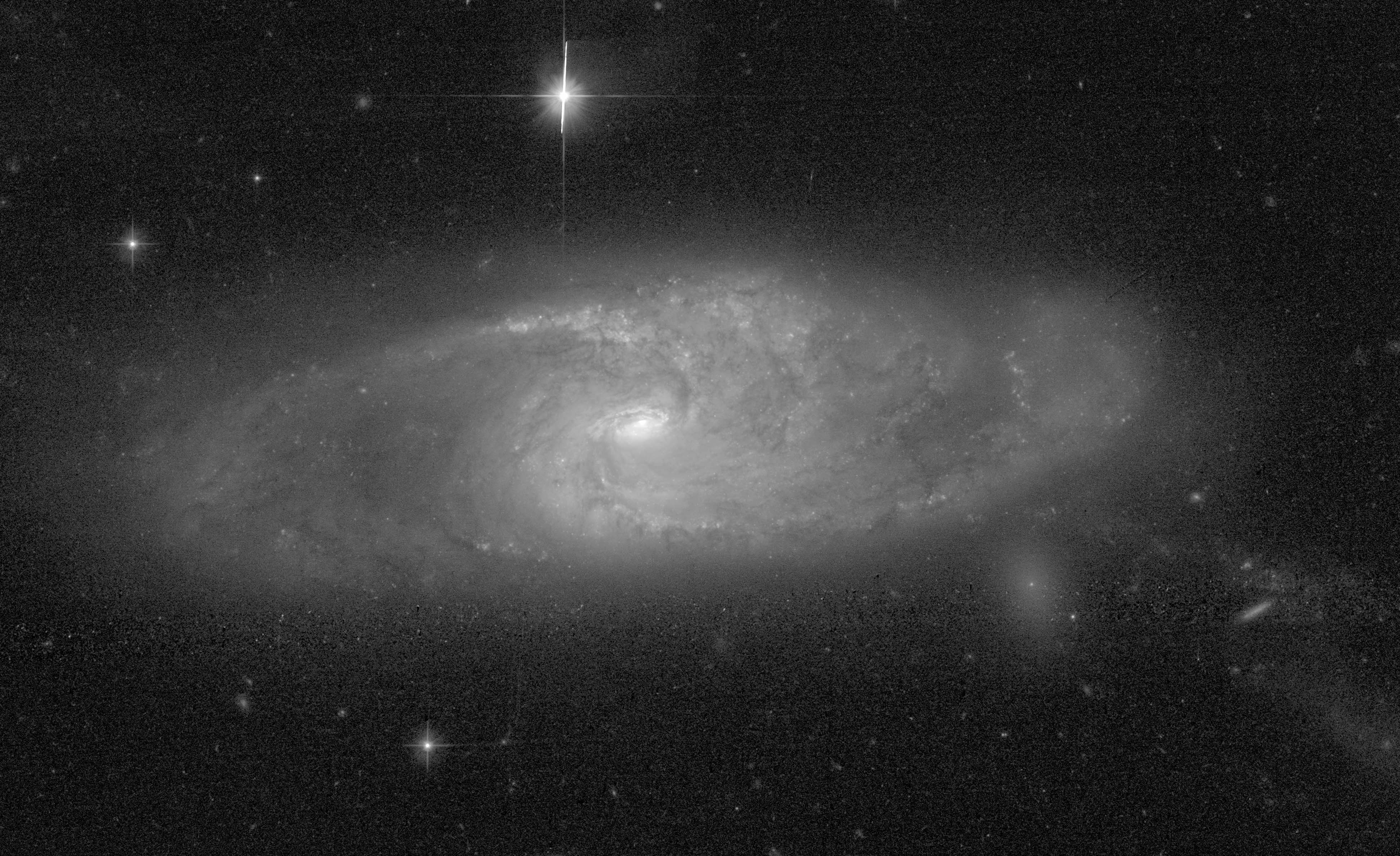
NGC 1134 with Hubble ACS

== Supernova ==
One supernova has been observed in NGC 1134: SN 2025pfh (Type Ic, mag. 19.0895) was discovered by Zwicky Transient Facility on 26 June 2025.

== See also ==
- List of NGC objects (1001–2000)
