= STS-109 =

2002 American crewed spaceflight to the Hubble Space Telescope

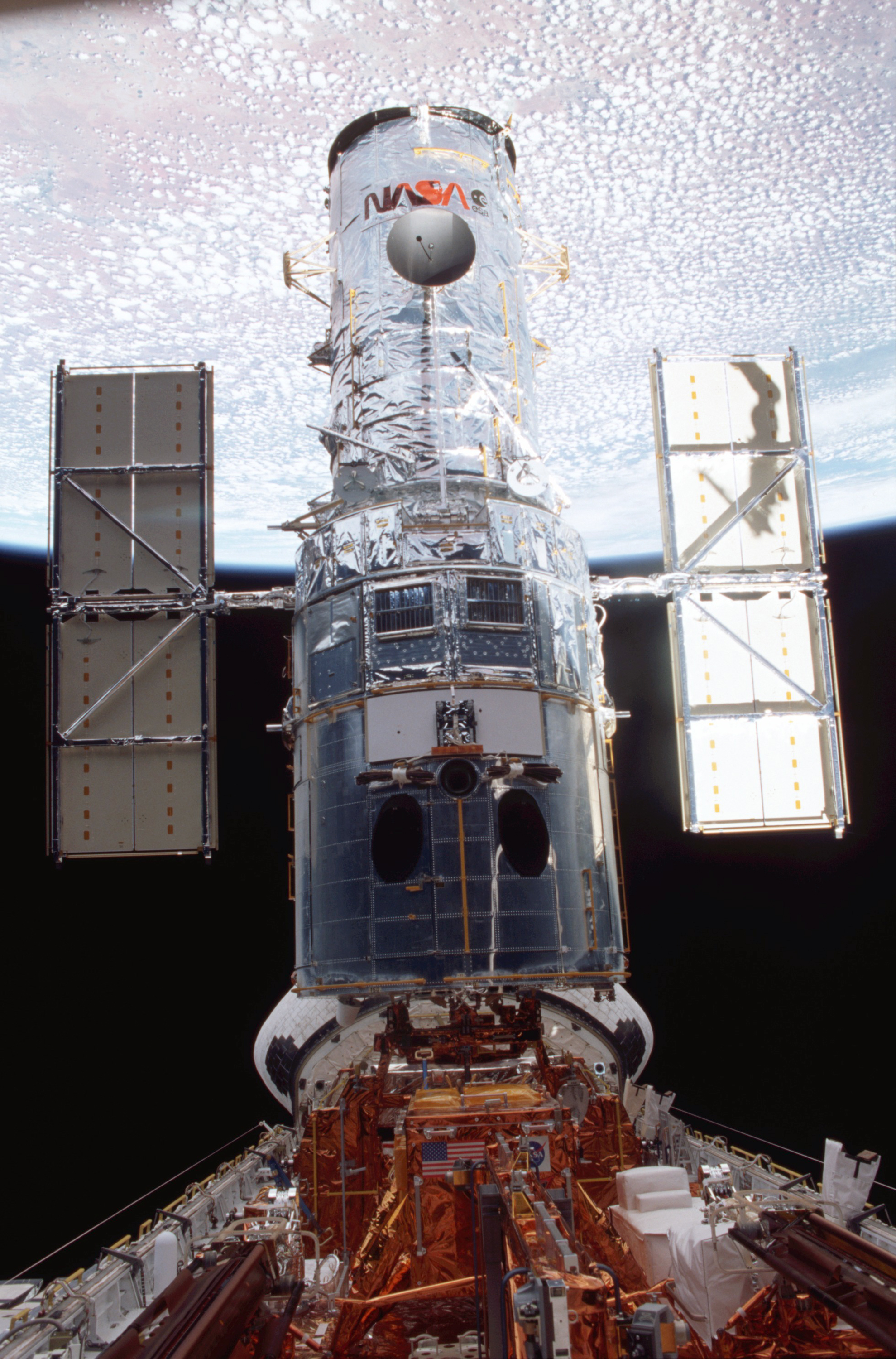
- The Hubble Space Telescope in Columbia's payload bay towards the end of the mission
- Names: Space Transportation System-109
- Mission type: Hubble servicing
- Operator: NASA
- COSPAR ID: 2002-010A
- SATCAT no.: 27388
- Mission duration: 10 days, 22 hours, 11 minutes, 09 seconds
- Distance travelled: 6,300,000 kilometres (3,900,000 mi)
- Orbits completed: 165

Spacecraft properties
- Spacecraft: Space Shuttle Columbia
- Launch mass: 116,989 kg (257,917 lb)
- Landing mass: 100,564 kg (221,706 lb)

Crew
- Crew size: 7
- Members: Scott D. Altman; Duane G. Carey; John M. Grunsfeld; Nancy J. Currie; Richard M. Linnehan; James H. Newman; Michael J. Massimino

Start of mission
- Launch date: 1 March 2002 11:22:02 UTC, 6:22:02 am EST
- Launch site: Kennedy, LC-39A

End of mission
- Landing date: 12 March 2002 09:33:10 UTC, 4:33:10 am EST
- Landing site: Kennedy, SLF Runway 33

Orbital parameters
- Reference system: Geocentric
- Regime: Low Earth
- Perigee altitude: 486 km (302 mi)
- Apogee altitude: 578 km (359 mi)
- Inclination: 28.5 degrees
- Period: 95.3 minutes
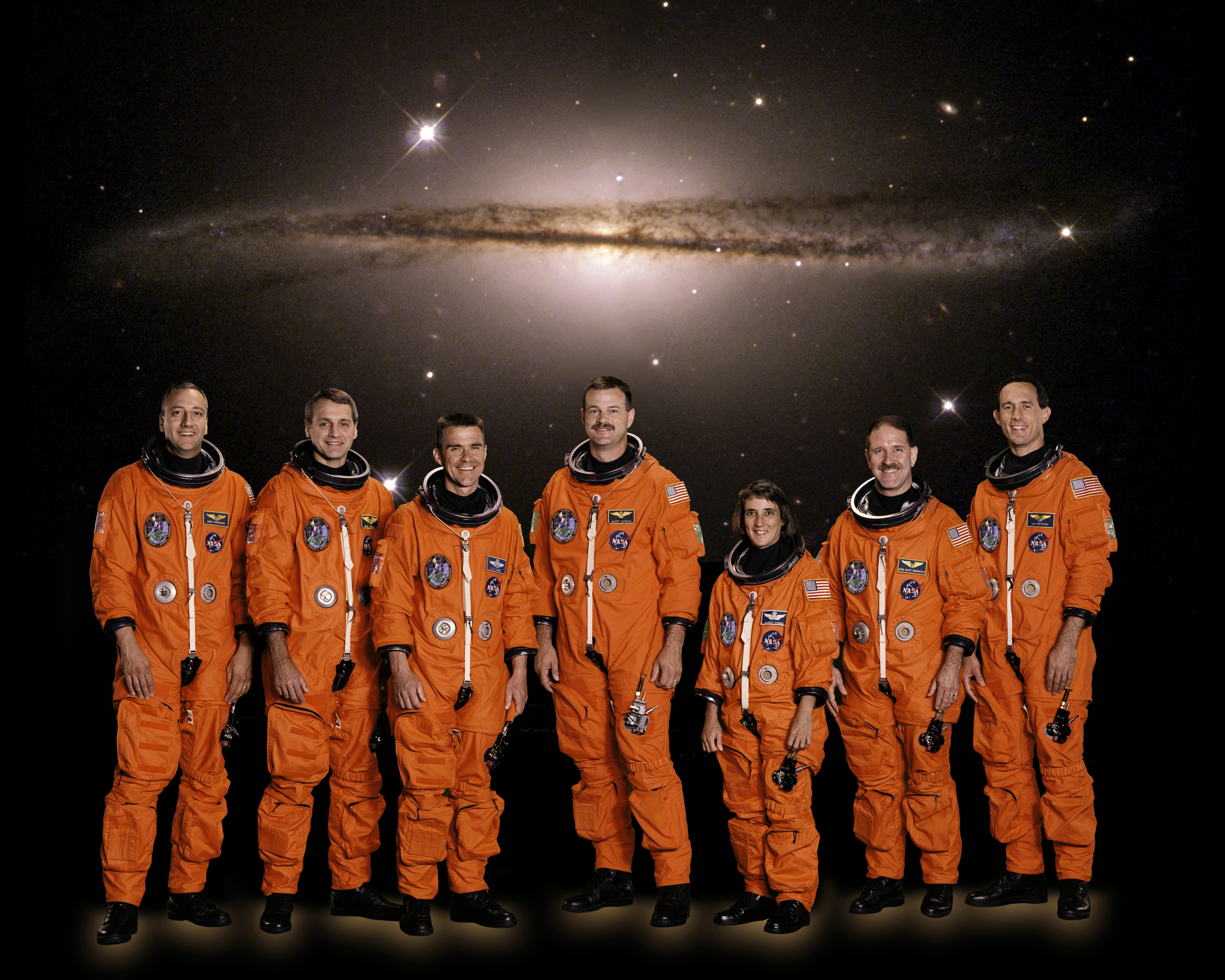
- (L-R): Michael J. Massimino, Richard M. Linnehan, Duane G. Carey, Scott D. Altman, Nancy J. Currie, John M. Grunsfeld and James H. Newman. Space Shuttle program Hubble Space Telescope missions

STS-109 (Hubble Servicing Mission 3B 'SM3B') was a Space Shuttle mission that launched from the Kennedy Space Center on 1 March 2002. It was the 108th mission of the Space Shuttle program, the 27th flight of the orbiter Columbia and the fourth servicing of the Hubble Space Telescope. It was also the penultimate mission of the orbiter Columbia before the STS-107 mission, which was destroyed during re-entry in the Columbia disaster.

The Hubble Space Telescope (HST) was placed in orbit during mission STS-31 on 25 April 1990. Initially designed to operate for 15 years, plans for periodic service and refurbishment were incorporated into its mission from the start. After the successful completion of the second planned service mission (SM2) by the crew of STS-82 in February 1997, three of the telescope's six gyroscopes failed. NASA decided to split the third planned service mission into two parts, SM3A and SM3B. A fifth and final servicing mission, STS-125 (SM4) launched on 11 May 2009. The work performed during SM4 kept HST in operation through 2025.

== Crew ==
Position	Astronaut
Commander	Scott D. Altman; Third spaceflight
Pilot	Duane G. Carey; Only spaceflight
Mission Specialist 1	John M. Grunsfeld; Fourth spaceflight
Mission Specialist 2 Flight Engineer	Nancy J. Currie; Fourth and last spaceflight
Mission Specialist 3	Richard M. Linnehan; Third spaceflight
Mission Specialist 4	James H. Newman; Fourth and last spaceflight
Mission Specialist 5	Michael J. Massimino; First spaceflight

=== Crew seat assignments ===
Seat	Launch	Landing	Seats 1–4 are on the flight deck. Seats 5–7 are on the mid-deck.
1	Altman		Seats 1–4 are on the flight deck. Seats 5–7 are on the mid-deck.
2	Carey		Seats 1–4 are on the flight deck. Seats 5–7 are on the mid-deck.
3	Grunsfeld	Linnehan	Seats 1–4 are on the flight deck. Seats 5–7 are on the mid-deck.
4	Currie-Gregg		Seats 1–4 are on the flight deck. Seats 5–7 are on the mid-deck.
5	Linnehan	Grunsfeld	Seats 1–4 are on the flight deck. Seats 5–7 are on the mid-deck.
6	Newman		Seats 1–4 are on the flight deck. Seats 5–7 are on the mid-deck.
7	Massimino		Seats 1–4 are on the flight deck. Seats 5–7 are on the mid-deck.

== Spacewalks ==
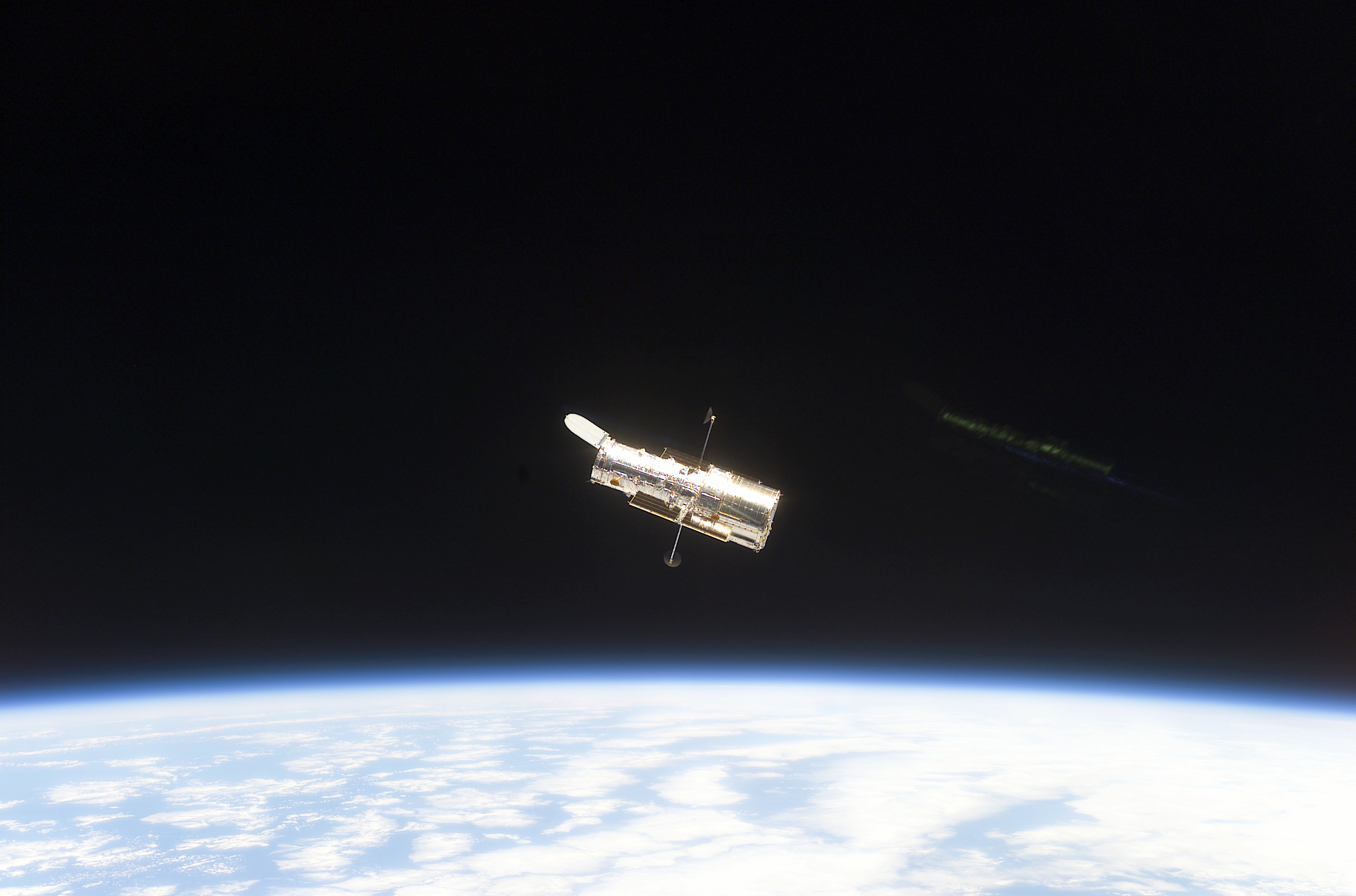
Hubble Space Telescope sporting new solar arrays during SM3B.

EVA	Team	Start – UTC	End – UTC	Duration
1	Grunsfeld; Linnehan	4 March 2002, 06:37	4 March 2002, 13:38	7:01
2	Newman; Massimino	5 March 2002, 06:40	5 March 2002, 13:56	7:16
3	Grunsfeld; Linnehan	6 March 2002, 08:28	6 March 2002, 15:16	6:48
4	Newman; Massimino	7 March 2002, 09:00	7 March 2002, 16:18	7:18
5	Grunsfeld; Linnehan	8 March 2002, 08:46	8 March 2002, 16:18	7:32

== Mission highlights ==
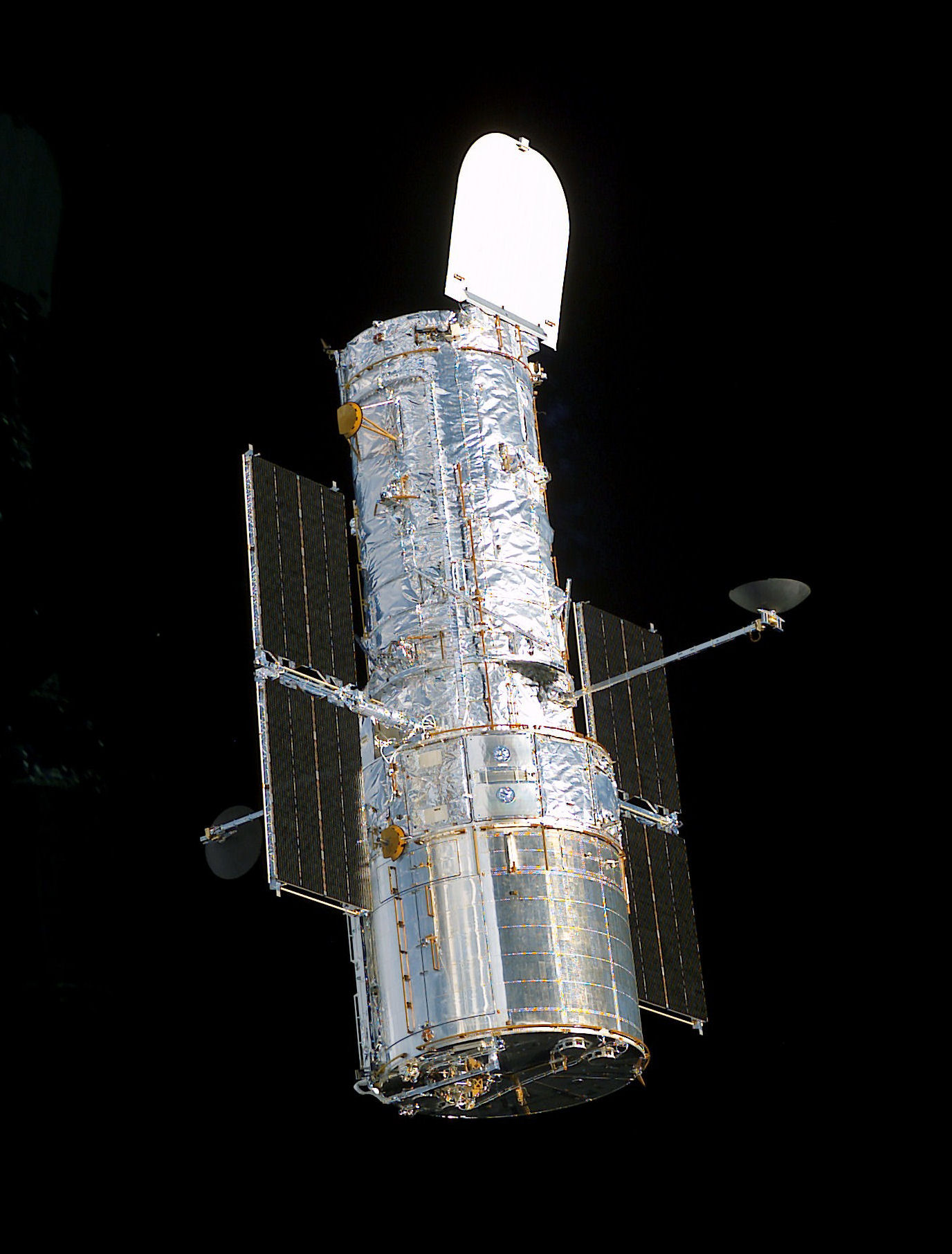
Hubble Space Telescope after servicing by the crew of STS-109

The purpose of STS-109 was to service the Hubble Space Telescope (HST). It was Columbia's first flight following an extensive two and a half year modification period (its most recent mission being STS-93). During the mission the crew installed a new science instrument, the Advanced Camera for Surveys (ACS), new rigid solar arrays (SA3), a new Power Control Unit (PCU) and an experimental cryocooler for the Near Infrared Camera and Multi-Object Spectrometer (NICMOS). Columbia also reboosted HST to a higher orbit.

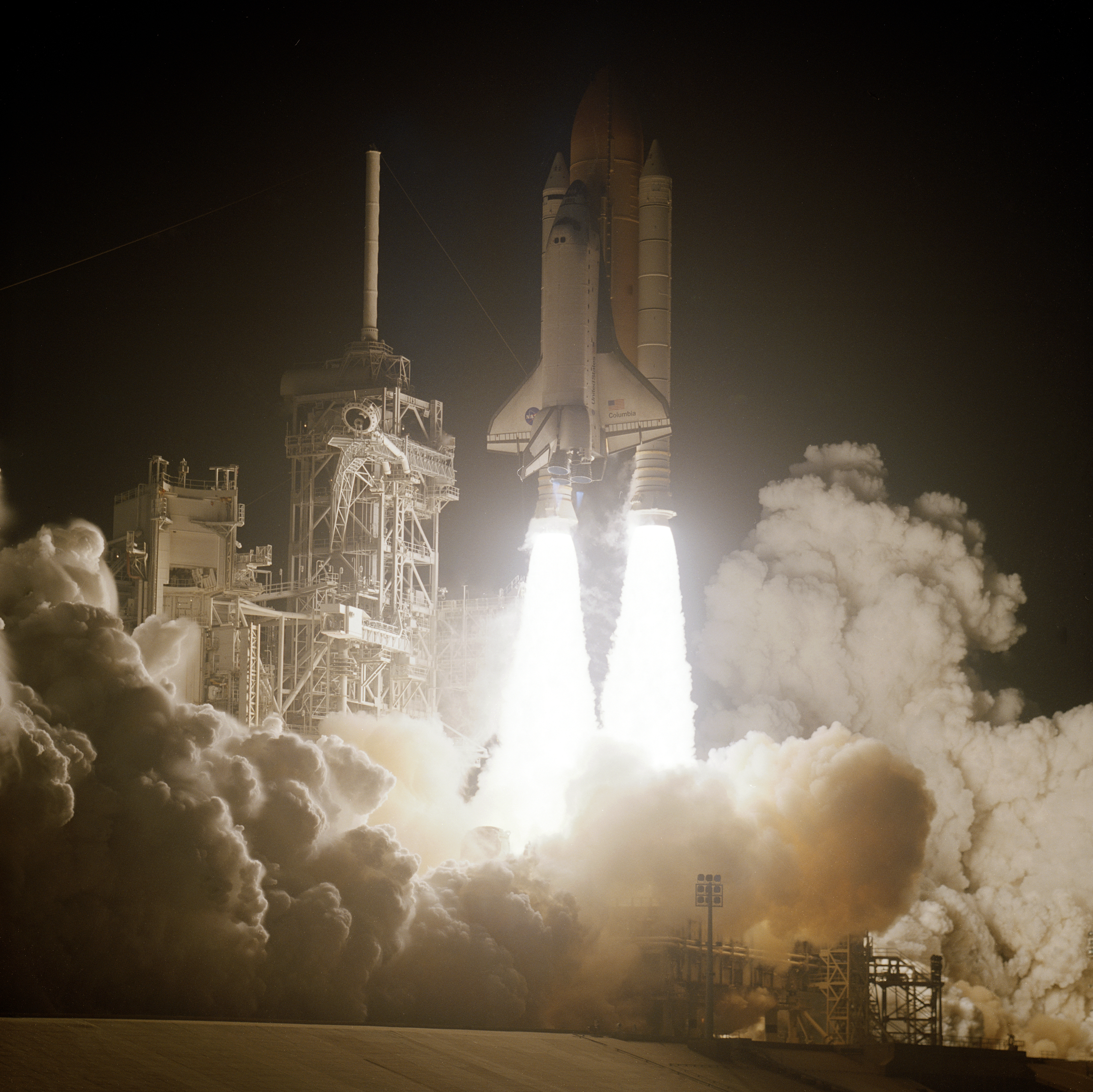
STS-109 Launch (March 1, 2002)

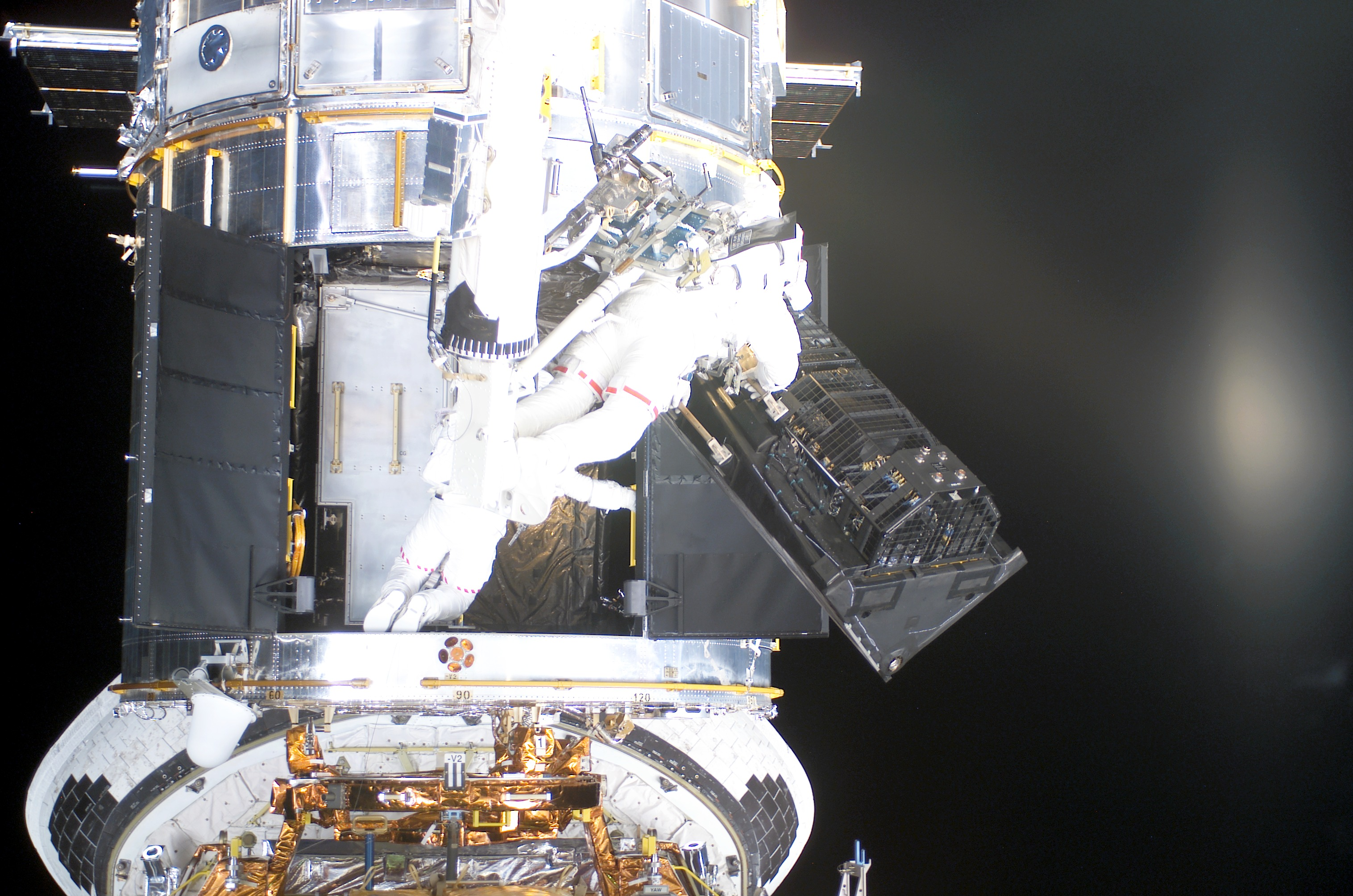
Astronauts remove the FOC to make room for the ACS

The STS-109 astronauts performed a total of five spacewalks in five consecutive days to service and upgrade the Hubble Space Telescope. The spacewalkers received assistance from their crewmates inside Columbia. Currie operated the Shuttle's robot arm while Altman was her backup. Carey and Altman documented the EVAs with video and still images.

Accomplishments of the spacewalks included the installation of new solar arrays, a new camera, a new Power Control Unit, a Reaction Wheel Assembly and an experimental cooling system for the NICMOS unit. STS-109 accumulated a total of 35 hours, 55 minutes of EVA time. Following STS-109, a total of 18 spacewalks had been conducted during four Space Shuttle missions to service Hubble (the others being STS-61, STS-82, STS-103 and STS-125) for a total of 129 hours, 10 minutes by 14 different astronauts.

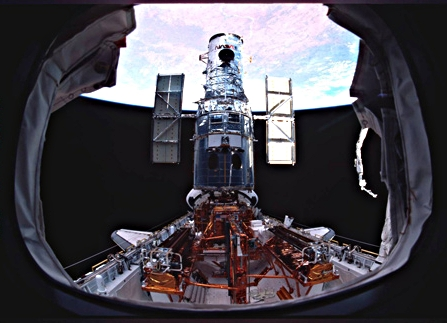
Hubble on the payload bay just prior to being released by the STS-109 crew.

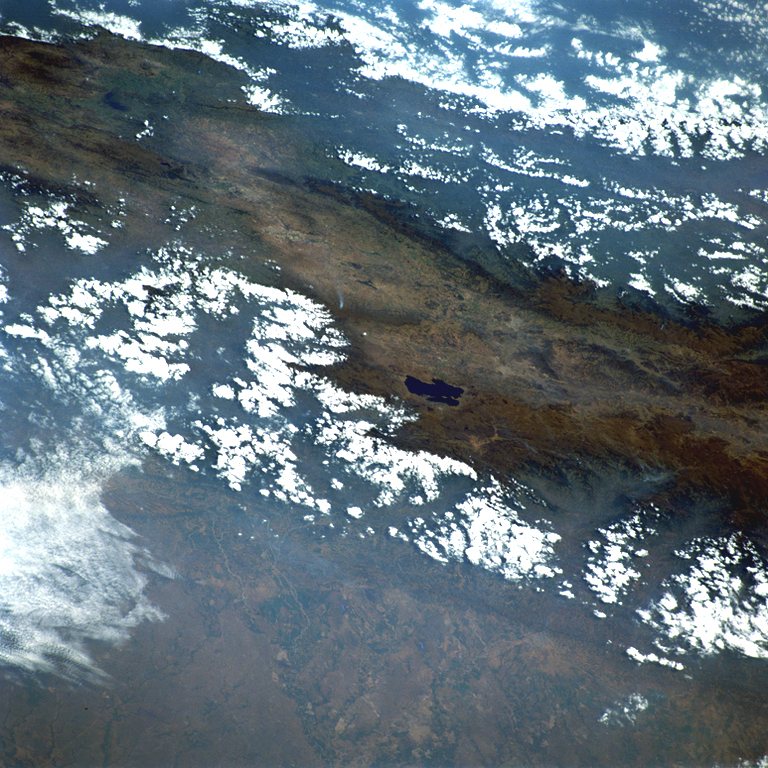
View of the Eastern Ranges of the Andean natural region, taken from STS-109. Lake Tota is clearly visible.

Columbia made its twenty-seventh and last successful landing at Kennedy Space Center, as on its next mission, STS-107, it disintegrated on re-entry, killing all aboard.

STS-109 is considered a night launch, as sunrise was at 6:47 am, and Columbia launched at 6:22 am EST, 25 minutes before sunrise.

Attempt	Planned	Result	Turnaround	Reason	Decision point	Weather go (%)	Notes
1	28 Feb 2002, 6:48:14 am	Scrubbed	—	Technical	27 Feb 2002, 3:20 pm	60	Wrong bearings installed on Columbia's main landing gear.
2	1 Mar 2002, 6:22:02 am	Success	0 days 23 hours 34 minutes			80	

== See also ==
- List of human spaceflights
- List of Space Shuttle missions
- Outline of space science
