= William George Fastie =

American physicist and spectroscopist

- Born: December 6, 1916; Baltimore
- Died: July 14, 2000 (aged 83); Baltimore
- Occupation: physicist
- Known for: Contributions to the American space program

William George Fastie (6 December 1916 – 14 July 2000) was an American optical physicist and spectroscopist who played a part in the Johns Hopkins University space program of the late 1950s.

== Early years ==
Fastie was born on December 6, 1916 in Baltimore, Maryland. He was one of four children of William Ferdinand and Carolyn Fastie. He attended Johns Hopkins University between 1934 and 1941, initially at evening classes and later as a graduate student in physics, supervised by August Herman Pfund, Robert W. Wood, and Gerhard Heinrich Dieke.

== Career ==
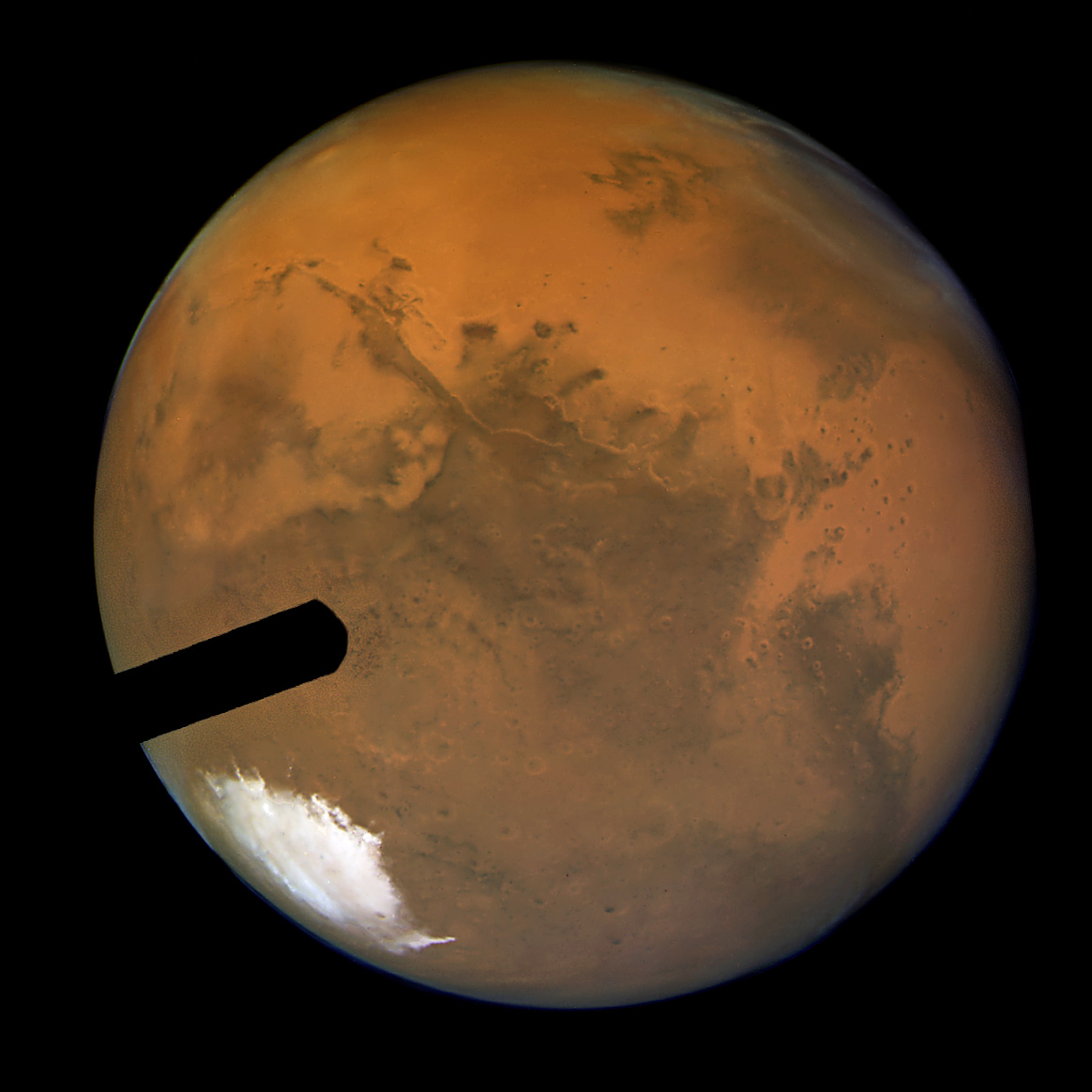
Hubble's ACS/HRC captures Mars during its 2003 opposition, yielding the sharpest visible-light color (RGB) photo yet taken from Earth. At about 8 km / pixel, various martian craters and markings are revealed. The ACS "Fastie finger" is blocking light on the left.

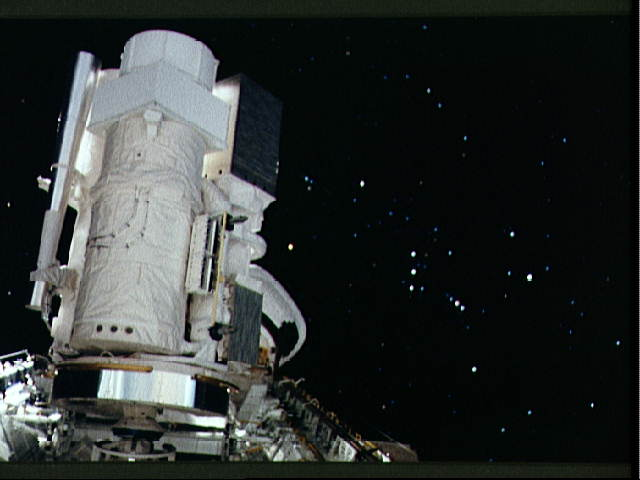
Hopkins Ultraviolet Telescope in space on Astro-1, Space Shuttle mission STS-35 in 1990

During World War II, Fastie's work in the department of physics involved the development of infrared detectors. At the end of the War he joined Leeds & Northrup as a research physicist, but was lured back to Hopkins in 1951 by the professor of physics, John D. Strong.

Fastie's first publication described a new design of spectrometer which today bears his name. With the launch of Sputnik 1, Fastie saw the potential of spectroscopy from space, and started a program at Hopkins to develop this idea. Initially concentrating on spectroscopic analysis of the Earth's upper atmosphere, it soon broadened into a full-fledged astronomy program, using accurately pointed telescopes.

He contributed to the Mariner 5 flyby of Venus in 1967, and the Mariner 6 and 7 flybys of Mars in 1969, as well as heading the ultraviolet spectrometer experiment on Apollo 17 in 1972 - the missions using ultraviolet spectrometers designed by Fastie in 1952. Known today as the Ebert-Fastie spectrometer, it has a design similar to that described by Hermann Ebert in the early 1900s. Fastie's interests also moved to astronomy in the 1960s, and he designed a number of precision-pointing telescopes whose designs are still used in sounding rockets.

In 1977 NASA appointed Fastie as a member of the Hubble Space Telescope (HST) science working group. In 1979, the Association of Universities for Research in Astronomy Inc suggested Hopkins as the home for the Space Telescope Science Institute. Fastie provided a detailed formulation for the proposal. The bio-luminescence of Chesapeake Bay was added to his list of interests, as was the development of new designs of spectroscope.

Fastie retired from Hopkins in 1982, but continued to work on campus for another 15 years. He contributed to the design of the Hopkins Ultraviolet Telescope, used on the Space Shuttle in December 1990 and March 1995.

The 'Fastie Finger', a device in the Advanced Camera for Surveys used for masking unwanted bright astronomical light sources used, is named after him.

== Personal life ==
Fastie and his wife Frances raised two sons and a daughter.

Fastie died in Baltimore of pneumonia on July 14, 2000.
