= Duane G. Carey =

American astronaut and USAF lieutenant colonel (born 1957)

Duane Carey
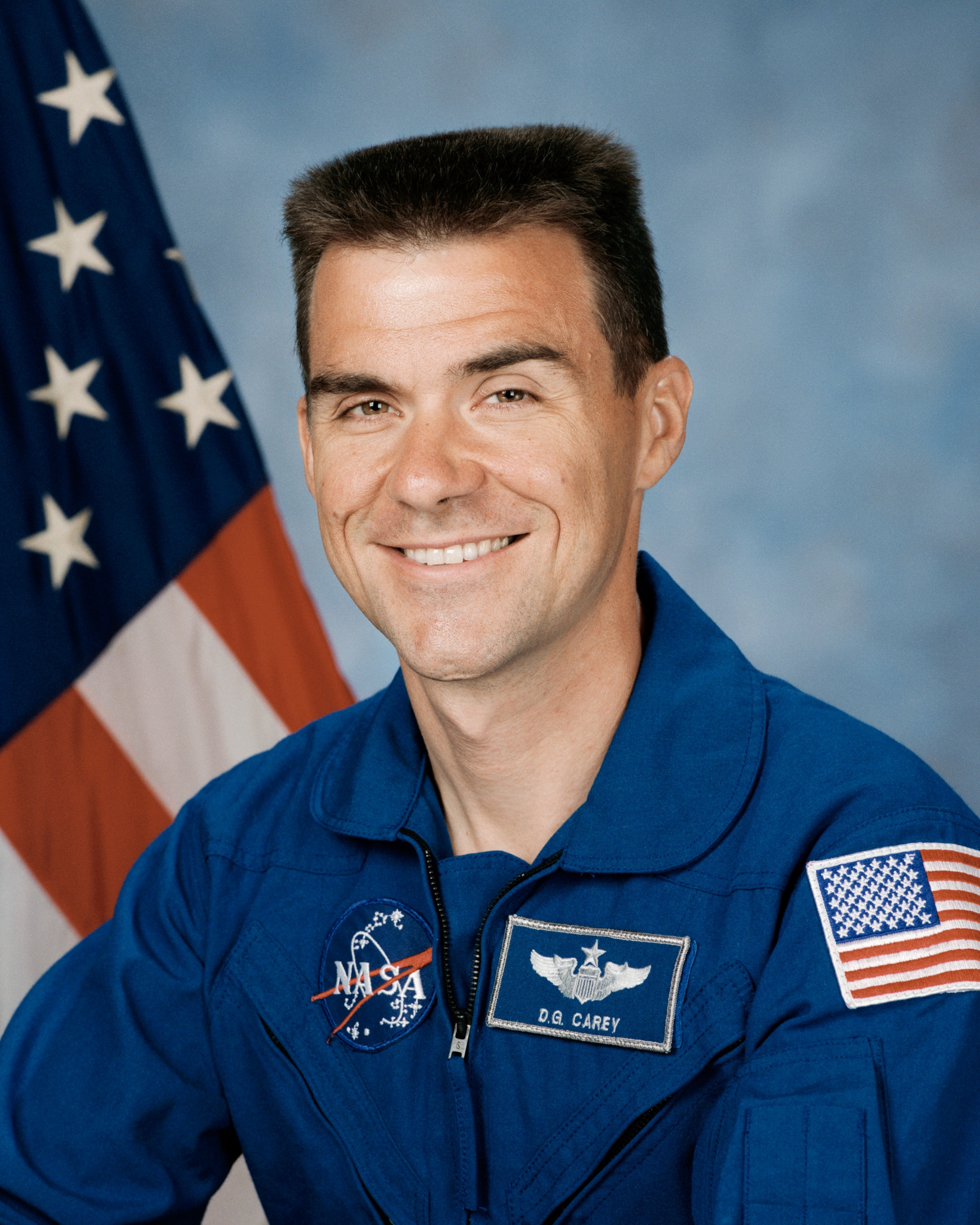
- Born: Duane Gene Carey; April 30, 1957 (age 69); Saint Paul, Minnesota, U.S.
- Other name: Digger
- Education: University of Minnesota (BS, MS)
- Spouse: Cheryl Tobritzhofer
- Children: 2
- Space career

NASA astronaut
- Rank: Lieutenant Colonel, USAF
- Time in space: 10d 22h 10m
- Selection: NASA Group 16 (1996)
- Missions: STS-109
- Mission insignia

Duane Gene "Digger" Carey (born April 30, 1957) is a retired lieutenant colonel in the United States Air Force and a former NASA astronaut. He piloted the space shuttle Columbia on March 1, 2002, during a Hubble Space Telescope servicing mission.

== Education ==
Carey graduated from Highland Park High School in Saint Paul, Minnesota, in 1975. He received a Bachelor of Science degree in Aerospace Engineering and Mechanics, and a Master of Science degree in Aerospace Engineering from the University of Minnesota in 1981 and 1982, respectively.

== Flying career ==
Carey received his commission from the Air Force Reserve Officer Training Corps in 1981 and graduated from Undergraduate Pilot Training in 1983. He flew the A-10A Thunderbolt II during tours at England Air Force Base, Louisiana, and Suwon Air Base, Republic of Korea. He completed F-16 Fighting Falcon training in 1988 and was assigned to Torrejon Air Base, Spain.

In 1991, he was selected to attend the U.S. Air Force Test Pilot School at Edwards Air Force Base, California. After graduation in 1992, he worked as an F-16 experimental test pilot and System Safety Officer at Edwards. He has logged over 4,300 hours in more than 35 types of aircraft.

== NASA career ==
Carey was selected as an astronaut candidate by NASA in April 1996. He reported to the NASA Johnson Space Center in August 1996. After the completion of two years of training and evaluation, he was qualified for flight assignment as a pilot. Initially, he was assigned technical duties in the Astronaut Office Spacecraft Systems/Operations Branch.

In 2002, he served as the pilot of Columbia on STS-109, logging over 10 days in space. STS-109 (March 1–12, 2002). STS-109 was the fourth Hubble Space Telescope (HST) servicing mission. The crew of STS-109 successfully upgraded the Hubble Space Telescope, leaving it with a new power unit, a new camera and new solar arrays. HST servicing and upgrade was accomplished by four crew members during five EVAs on five consecutive days. Carey also helped document the EVA activities with video and still images. STS-109 orbited the Earth 165 times, and covered 3.9 million miles in over 262 hours.

Carey retired from NASA in October 2004.

== Personal life ==
He is married to Cheryl Ann Tobritzhofer, also of Saint Paul, Minnesota. They have two children.

He is a member of the National Space Society and American Motorcyclist Association, and the Air Force Association.

== Honors ==
Carey has been awarded the Distinguished Flying Cross with Valor Device and three Air Medals, as well as the American Motorcyclist Association Hazel Kolb Brighter Image Award.
