= John M. Grunsfeld =

American astronaut and astronomer (born 1958)

John Grunsfeld
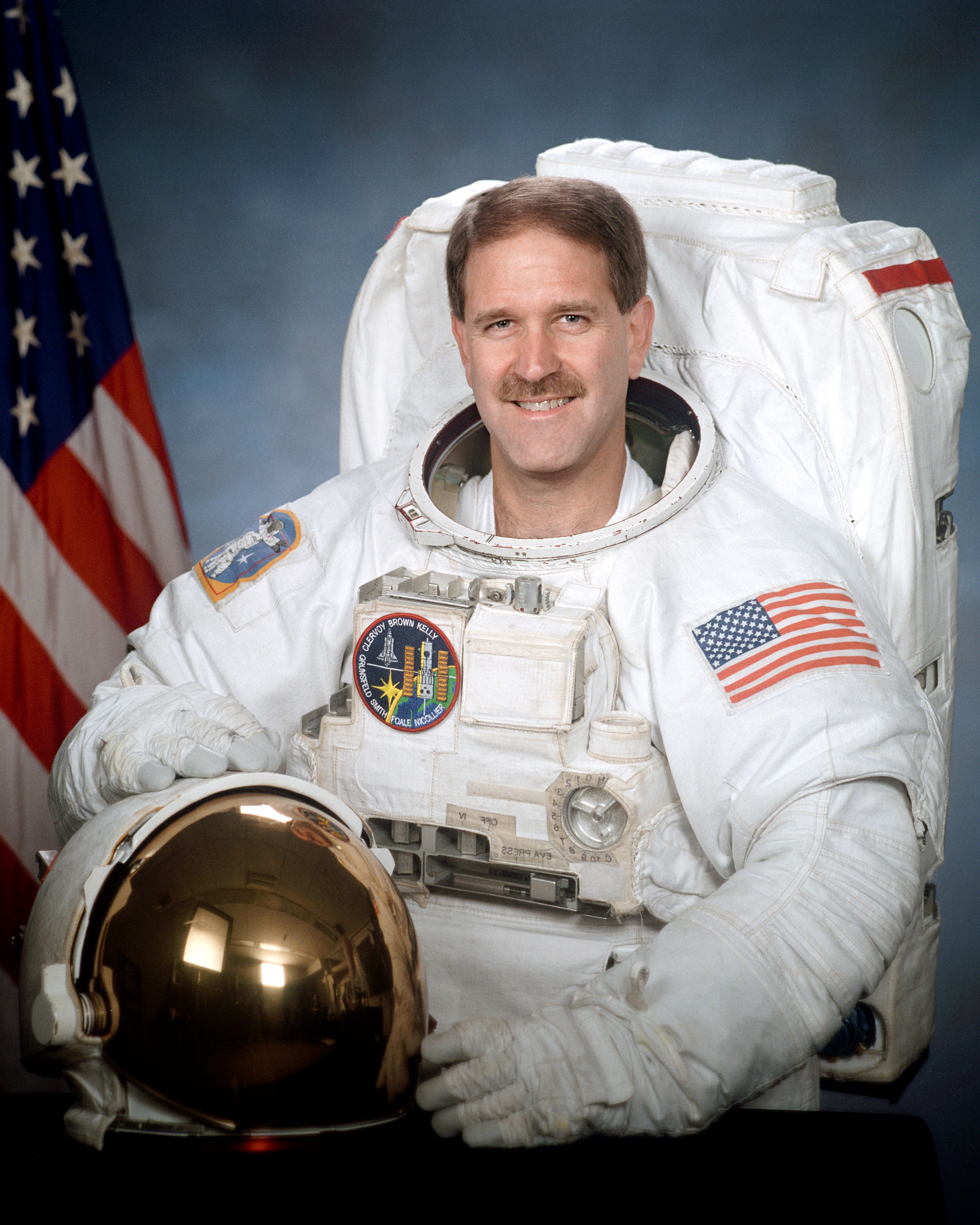
- Grunsfeld in 2000
- Born: John Mace Grunsfeld; October 10, 1958 (age 68); Chicago, Illinois, U.S.
- Education: Massachusetts Institute of Technology (BS); University of Chicago (MS, PhD)
- Space career

NASA astronaut
- Time in space: 58d 15h 3m
- Selection: NASA Group 14 (1992)
- Total EVAs: 8
- Total EVA time: 58h 30m
- Mission: STS-67; STS-81; STS-103; STS-109; STS-125
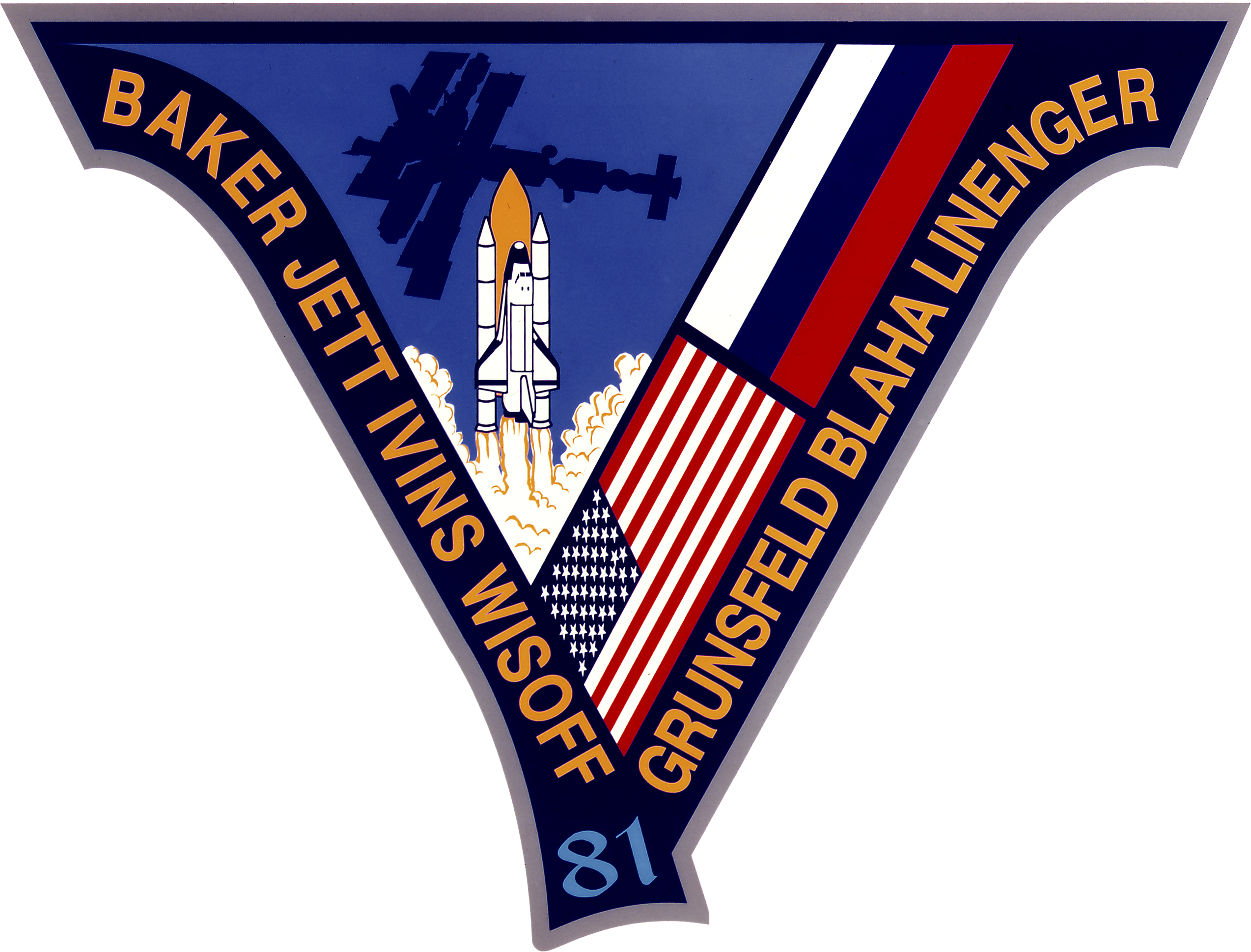
- Mission insignia
- Scientific career
- Fields: Physics
- Thesis: The Energy Spectrum of the Iron Group Elements in the Cosmic Rays from 50-1000 GeV/amu (1988)

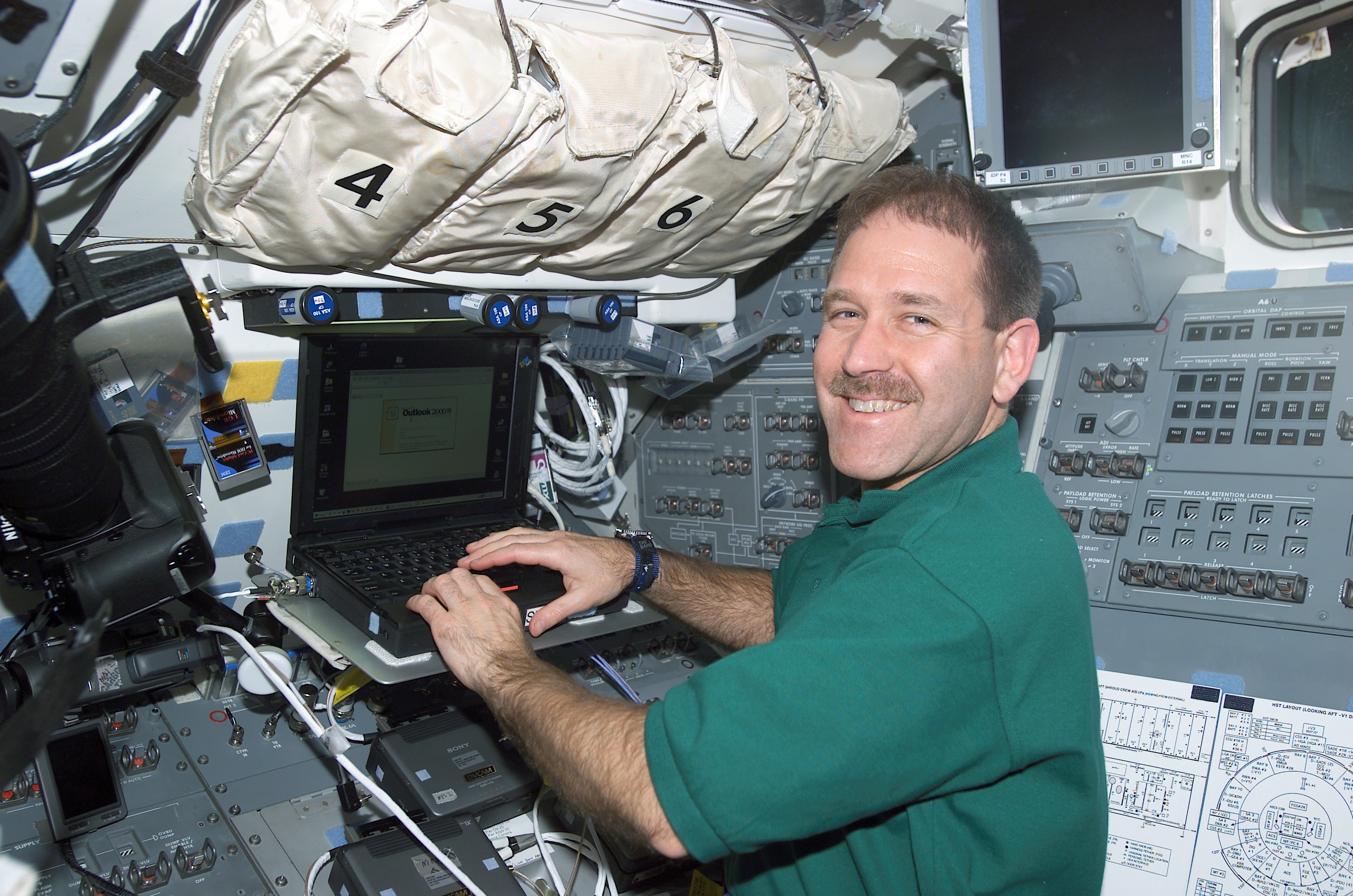
John Grunsfeld during STS-109, March 4, 2002

John Mace Grunsfeld (born October 10, 1958) is an American physicist and a former NASA astronaut. He is a veteran of five Space Shuttle flights and has served as NASA Chief Scientist. His academic background includes research in high energy astrophysics, cosmic ray physics and the emerging field of exoplanet studies with specific interest in future astronomical instrumentation. After retiring from NASA in 2009, he served as the deputy director of the Space Telescope Science Institute in Baltimore, Maryland. In January 2012, he returned to NASA and served as associate administrator of NASA's Science Mission Directorate (SMD). Grunsfeld announced his retirement from NASA in April 2016.

== Personal life ==
Grunsfeld was born in Chicago, Illinois, to Ernest Alton 'Tony' Grunsfeld III, a distinguished Chicago architect, and Sally Mace Grunsfeld; grandson of architect Ernest Grunsfeld Jr., architect of the Adler Planetarium. He is married to the former Carol E. Schiff, with whom he has two children. Grunsfeld enjoys mountaineering, flying, sailing, bicycling, and music. His father, Ernest Grunsfeld III, died in 2011 at the age of 81.

== Education ==
Grunsfeld graduated from Highland Park High School in Highland Park, Illinois, in 1976. He attended the Massachusetts Institute of Technology, earning a Bachelor of Science in physics in 1980. He then attended the University of Chicago, earning a Master of Science in physics in 1984 and a Doctor of Philosophy in physics in 1988.

== Organizations ==
- American Astronomical Society
- American Institute of Aeronautics and Astronautics
- American Association for the Advancement of Science
- American Alpine Club
- Experimental Aircraft Association
- Aircraft Owners and Pilots Association.

== Awards and honors ==
- Fellow of the American Institute of Aeronautics and Astronautics (2024)
- von Braun Award from the American Institute of Aeronautics and Astronautics (2023)
- Fellow of the American Astronomical Society (2021)
- National Space Trophy, Rotary National Award for Space Achievement (2017)
- NASA Distinguished Service Medal (2002)
- NASA Exceptional Service Medals (1997, 1998, 2000)
- NASA Space Flight Medals (1995, 1997, 1999, 2002)
- NASA Graduate Student Research Fellow, 1985–1987
- W.D. Grainger Fellow in Experimental Physics, 1988–89
- Komarov Diploma (1995)
- Korolov Diploma (1999, 2002)
- Inductee into the United States Astronaut Hall of Fame.
- Distinguished Alumni Award, University of Chicago
- Alumni Service Award, University of Chicago

== Science career ==
Grunsfeld's academic positions include that of visiting scientist, University of Tokyo/Institute of Space and Astronautical Science (1980–81); graduate research assistant, University of Chicago (1981–1985); NASA Graduate Student Fellow, University of Chicago (1985–1987); W.D. Grainger Postdoctoral Fellow in Experimental Physics, University of Chicago (1988–1989); and senior research fellow, California Institute of Technology (1989–1992). Grunsfeld's research has covered x-ray and gamma-ray astronomy, high-energy cosmic ray studies, and development of new detectors and instrumentation. Grunsfeld studied binary pulsars and energetic x-ray and gamma ray sources using the NASA Compton Gamma Ray Observatory, x-ray astronomy satellites, radio telescopes, and optical telescopes including the NASA Hubble Space Telescope.

== NASA career ==
Grunsfeld was selected by NASA in March 1992 as an astronaut candidate and reported to the Johnson Space Center in August 1992. He completed one year of training and qualified for flight selection as a mission specialist. Grunsfeld was initially detailed to the Astronaut Office Mission Development Branch and was assigned as the lead for portable computers for use in space. Following his first flight, he led a team of engineers and computer programmers tasked with defining and producing the crew displays for command and control of the International Space Station (ISS). As part of this activity, he directed an effort combining the resources of the Mission Control Center (MCC) Display Team and the Space Station Training Facility. The result was the creation of the Common Display Development Facility (CDDF), responsible for the onboard and MCC displays for the International Space Station, using object-oriented programming techniques. Following his second flight, he was assigned as Chief of the Computer Support Branch in the Astronaut Office supporting Space Shuttle and International Space Station Programs and advanced technology development. Following STS-103, he served as Chief of the Extravehicular Activity Branch in the Astronaut Office. Following STS-109, Grunsfeld served as an instructor in the Extravehicular Activity Branch, and worked on the Orbital Space Plane, exploration concepts, and technologies for use beyond low-Earth orbit in the Advanced Programs Branch. He served as NASA Chief Scientist assigned to NASA Headquarters from 2003 to 2004. In January 2012, he became the associate administrator for the Science Mission Directorate at NASA's headquarters in Washington, replacing Ed Weiler.

Grunsfeld has been actively engaged in communicating space science topics to the public through interviews, public lectures, and television appearances. He was interviewed by NASA's Astrobiology Magazine about the James Webb Space Telescope and at the Science with Hubble Space Telescope III conference in Venice, Italy, about carrying out repairs and upgrades on the Hubble Space Telescope. His public lectures include Hugging Hubble at the Space Telescope Science Institute's May, 2010, Symposium, Big Science Questions at the 50th anniversary celebration of the Aspen Center for Physics and The Hubble Story presented as a special public lecture at Oxford University's department of physics. He has made several television appearances to discuss the successful landing of the Mars Curiosity rover in August 2012 and its mission, including appearances on the PBS NewsHour with Judy Woodruff, the Colbert Report, and on NASA television. On April 5, 2016, Grunsfield announced his retirement from NASA, starting April 30.

== Spaceflight experience ==
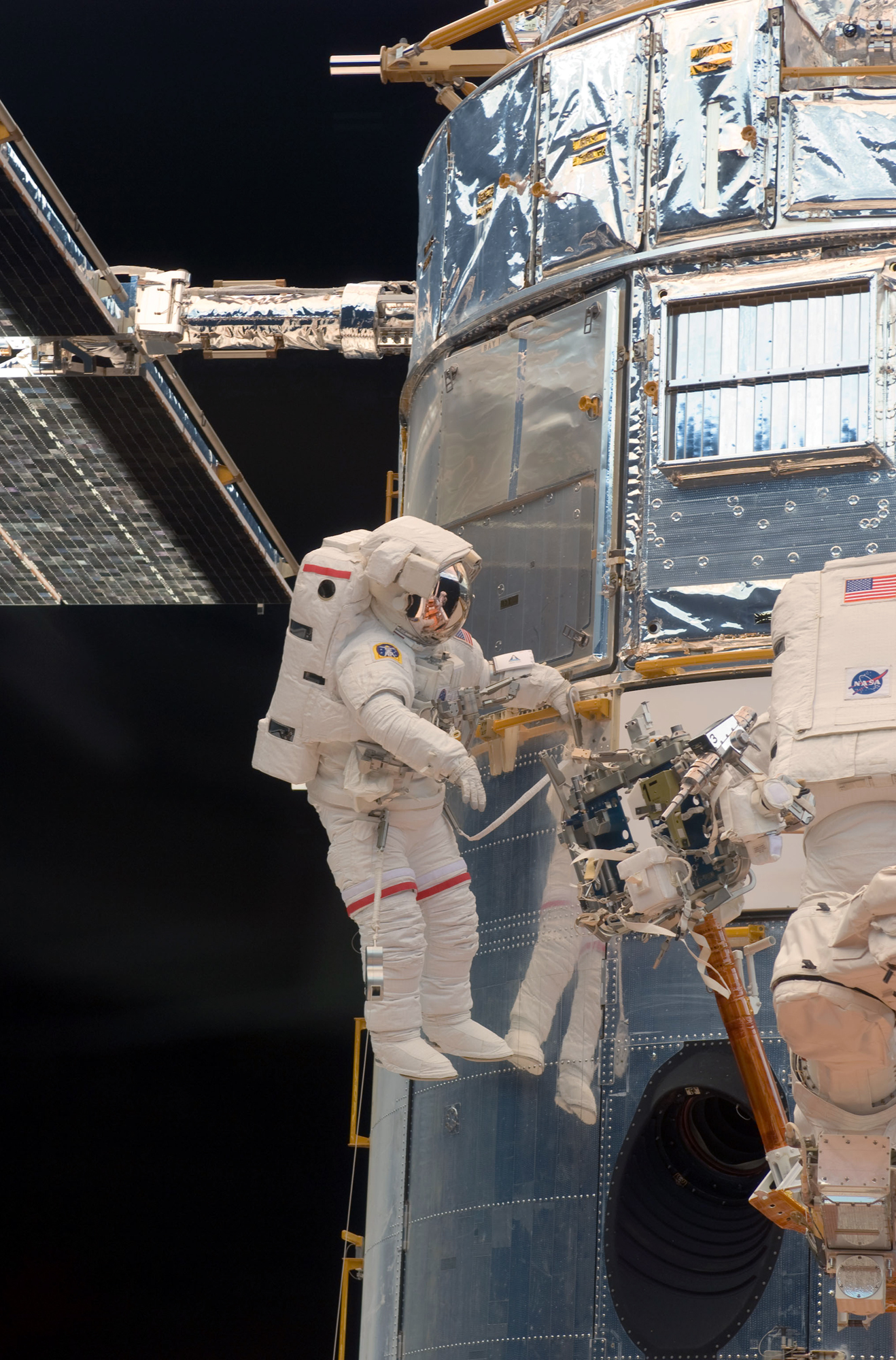
John Grunsfeld works on the Hubble Space Telescope during STS-125, May 14, 2009

STS-67/Astro-2 Space Shuttle Endeavour (March 2–18, 1995) was launched from Kennedy Space Center, Florida, and returned to land at Edwards Air Force Base, California. It was the second flight of the Astro observatory, a unique complement of three ultra-violet telescopes. During this record-setting 16-day mission, the crew conducted observations around the clock to study the far ultraviolet spectra of faint astronomical objects and the polarization of ultraviolet light coming from hot stars and distant galaxies. Mission duration was 399 hours and 9 minutes.

STS-81 Space Shuttle Atlantis (January 12–22, 1997) was a 10-day mission, the fifth to dock with Russia's Mir space station, and the second to exchange U.S. astronauts. The mission also carried the Spacehab double module providing additional middeck locker space for secondary experiments. In five days of docked operations more than three tons of food, water, experiment equipment and samples were moved back and forth between the two spacecraft. Grunsfeld served as the flight engineer on this flight. Following 160 orbits of the Earth the STS-81 mission concluded with a landing on Kennedy Space Center's Runway 33 ending a 3.9 million mile journey. Mission duration was 244 hours, 56 minutes. During this flight, Grunsfeld placed a phone call to NPR's auto-repair radio show, Car Talk. In this call he complained about the performance of his serial-numbered, Rockwell-manufactured "government van". To wit, it would run very loud and rough for about two minutes, quieter and smoother for another six and a half, and then the engine would stop with a jolt. He went on to state that the brakes of the vehicle, when applied, would glow red-hot, and that the vehicle's odometer displayed "about 60 million miles". This created some consternation for the hosts, until they noticed the audio of Grunsfeld's voice, being relayed from Mir via TDRS satellite, sounded similar to that of Tom Hanks in the then-recent film Apollo 13, after which they realized the call was from space and the government van in question was, in fact, the Space Shuttle.

STS-103 Space Shuttle Discovery (December 19–27, 1999) was an eight-day mission during which the crew successfully installed new gyroscopes and scientific instruments and upgraded systems on the Hubble Space Telescope (HST). Enhancing HST scientific capabilities required three spacewalks (EVA). Grunsfeld performed two spacewalks totaling 16 hours and 23 minutes. The STS-103 mission was accomplished in 120 Earth orbits, traveling 3.2 million miles in 191 hours and 11 minutes.

STS-109 Space Shuttle Columbia (March 1–12, 2002) was the fourth Hubble Space Telescope (HST) servicing mission. The crew of STS-109 successfully upgraded the Hubble Space Telescope installing a new digital camera, a cooling system for the infrared camera, new solar arrays and a new power system. HST servicing and upgrades were accomplished by four crewmembers during a total of five EVAs in five consecutive days. Grunsfeld served as the payload commander on STS-109 in charge of the space walking activities and the Hubble payload. He also performed three spacewalks totaling 21 hours and 9 minutes, including the installation of the new Power Control Unit. STS-109 orbited the Earth 165 times, and covered 3.9 million miles in over 262 hours.

STS-125 Space Shuttle Atlantis (May 11–24, 2009) was the fifth and final servicing mission to the Hubble Space Telescope. Atlantis launched from Kennedy Space Center Launch Pad 39A May 11, 2009, at 2:01 p.m. EDT, and landed on May 24, 2009 at California's Edwards Air Force Base. During the mission, Grunsfeld performed three of the mission's five back-to-back spacewalks, which installed two new instruments to the Hubble Space Telescope: The Cosmic Origins Spectrograph, and the Wide Field Camera 3. The mission also replaced a Fine Guidance Sensor, six new gyroscopes, and two battery unit modules, to allow the telescope to continue to function at least through 2014. One issue Grunsfeld and his crew experienced during the overhaul was the stripping of 10mm bolts due to improper assembly and technique which he discussed again on Car Talk.

Grunsfeld has logged over 58 days in space, including eight space walks totaling 58 hours and 30 minutes.

== Space Telescope Science Institute ==
In 2010, Grunsfeld left NASA to serve as deputy director of the Space Telescope Science Institute in Baltimore, where he helped to prepare the institute for operations with NASA's James Webb Space Telescope. He also became a research professor in the Johns Hopkins University department of physics and astronomy in July 2010.

== Mountaineering ==
Grunsfeld appeared on the PBS NOVA episode "Deadly Ascent", which showed him climbing Denali, the highest peak in North America, in June 2000. Grunsfeld, along with Howard Donner, (a consultant to NASA) conducted research into the effects of body temperature at high altitudes by using internal thermometers swallowed in pill form. He was able to climb to an altitude of 18,200 feet before one of the team members had difficulty forcing the team to turn back. Grunsfeld was inspired by Edmund Hillary, Tenzing Norgay, and Brad Washburn in mountaineering. In June 2004, Grunsfeld returned to Denali while on leave from NASA and successfully led a team of fellow NASA climbers that summitted. He is one of two astronauts to have climbed to the top of Denali.
