= Faint Object Camera =

Installed on HST from 1990 to 2002

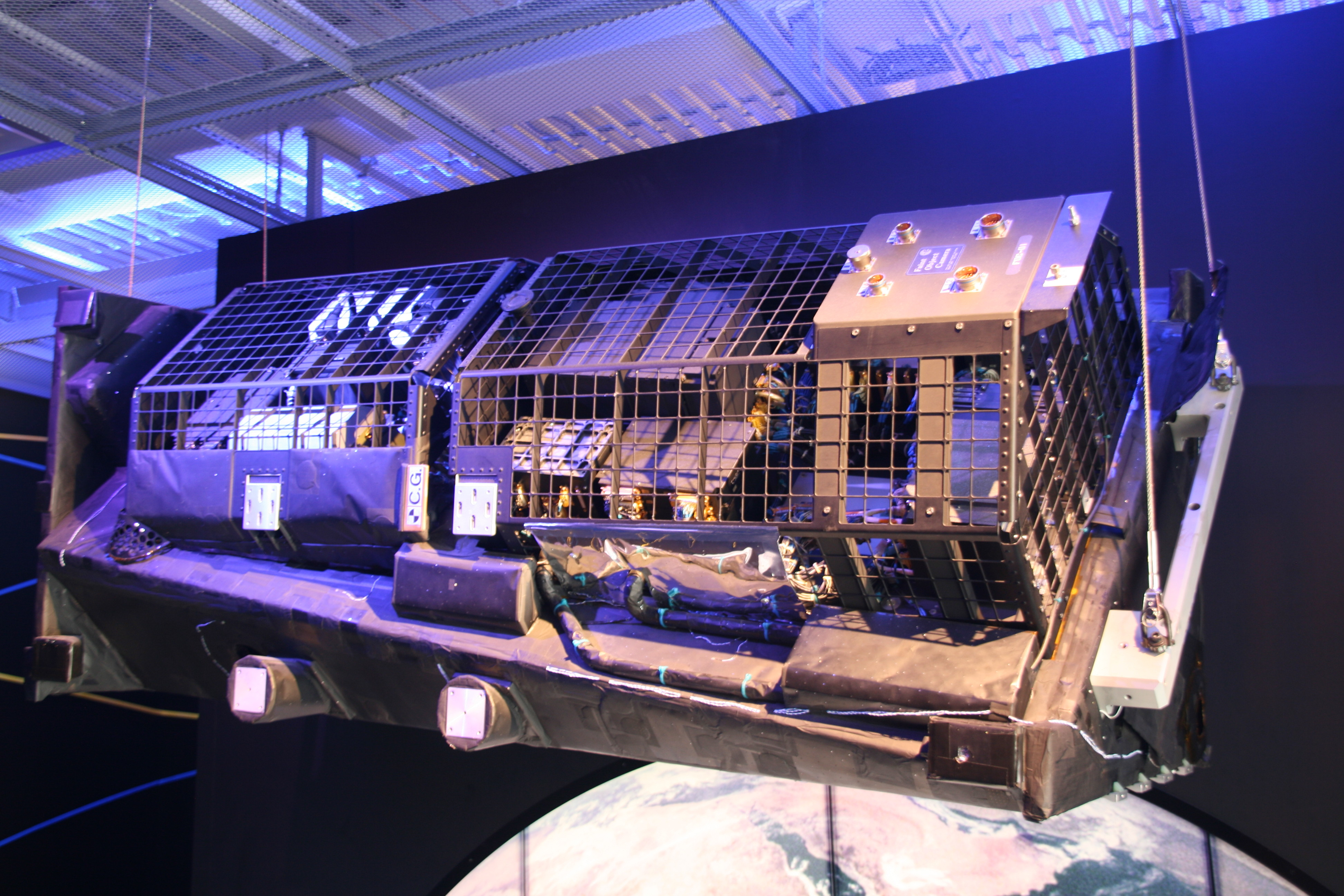
Faint Object Camera (Dornier Museum)

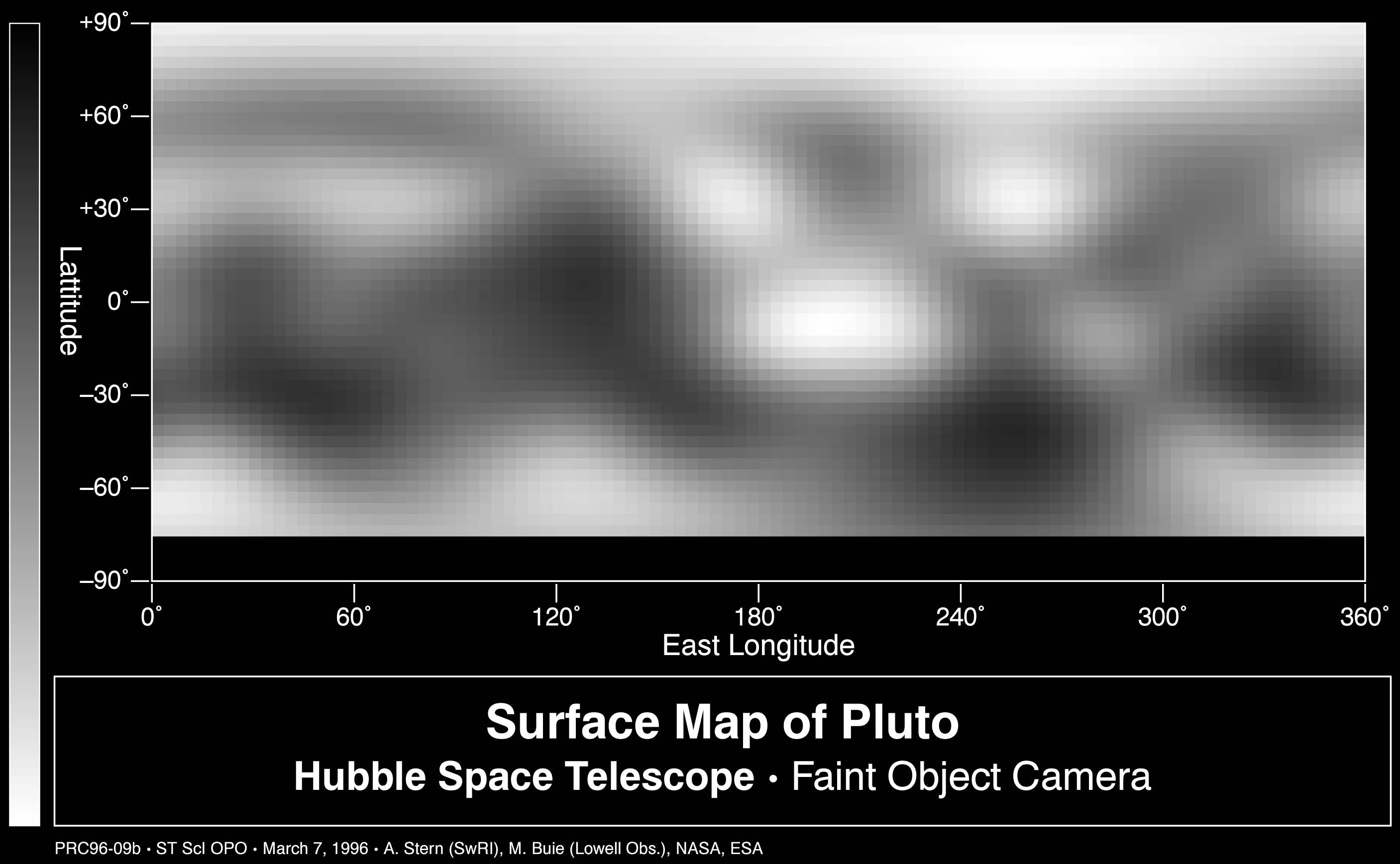
Surface map of Pluto by HST/FOC

The Faint Object Camera (FOC) was a camera installed on the Hubble Space Telescope from launch in 1990 until 2002. It was replaced by the Advanced Camera for Surveys. In December 1993, Hubble's vision was corrected on STS-61 by installing COSTAR, which corrected the problem with Hubble's mirror before it reached an instrument like FOC. Later instruments had this correction built in, which is why it was possible to later remove COSTAR itself and replace it with a new science instrument.

The camera was built by Dornier GmbH and was funded by the European Space Agency. The unit actually consists of two complete and independent camera systems designed to provide extremely high resolution, exceeding 0.05 arcseconds. It is designed to view very faint UV and optical light from 115 to 650 nanometers in wavelength. FOC has been compared to a "telephoto" lens, providing a high resolution in a small field of view. FOC could distinguish between two points 0.05 arc-seconds apart.

Rather than CCDs the FOC used photon-counting digicons as its detector.

The camera was designed to operate at low, medium, or high resolution. The angular resolution and field of view at each resolution were as follows:

	Angular resolution	Field of view
Low resolution (f/48)	0.043 arcseconds	22 arcseconds
Medium resolution (f/96)	0.022 arcseconds	11 arcseconds
High resolution (f/288)	0.0072 arcseconds	3.6 arcseconds

== Imaging examples ==
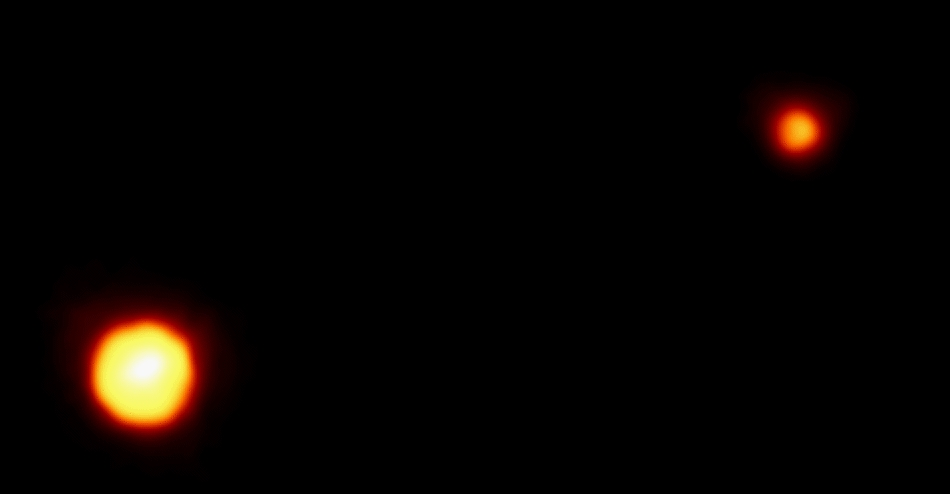
Pluto and its moon Charon revealed by the Hubble Faint Object Camera (1994)

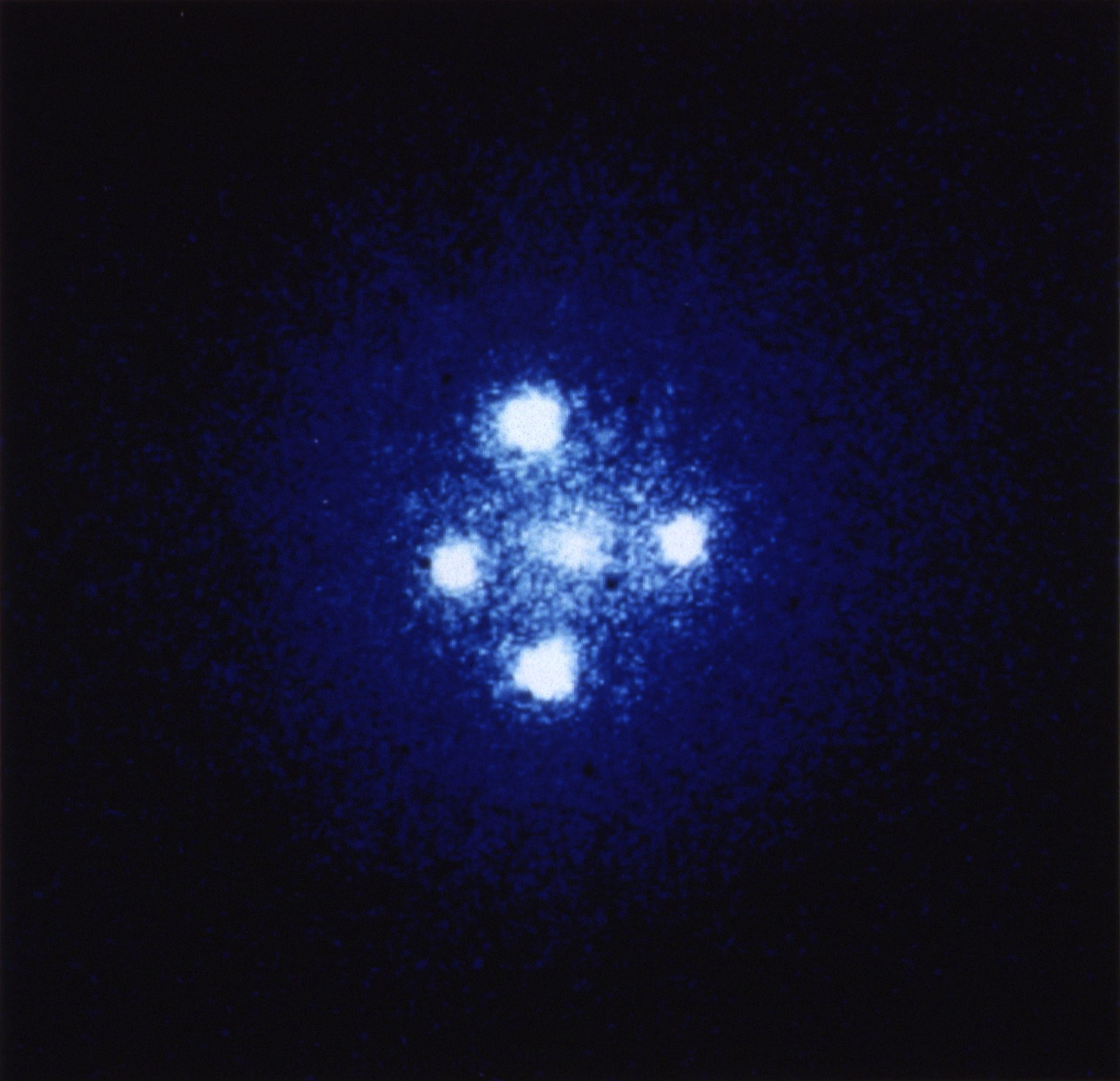
The "Einstein cross", discovered in 1985 by J. Huchra, is a large gravitational lens. 1990 Hubble image

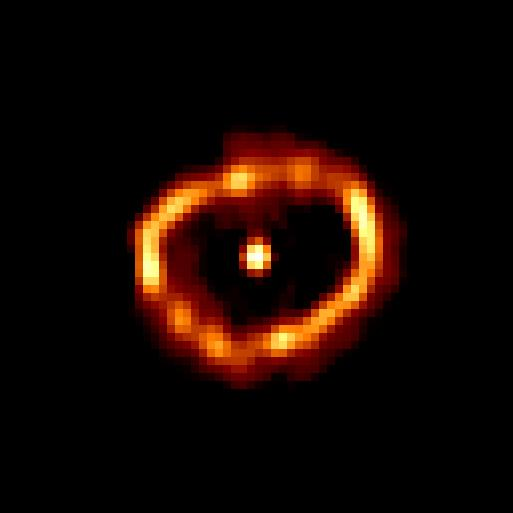
Nova Cygni 1992 with FOC/COSTAR

== Space work ==
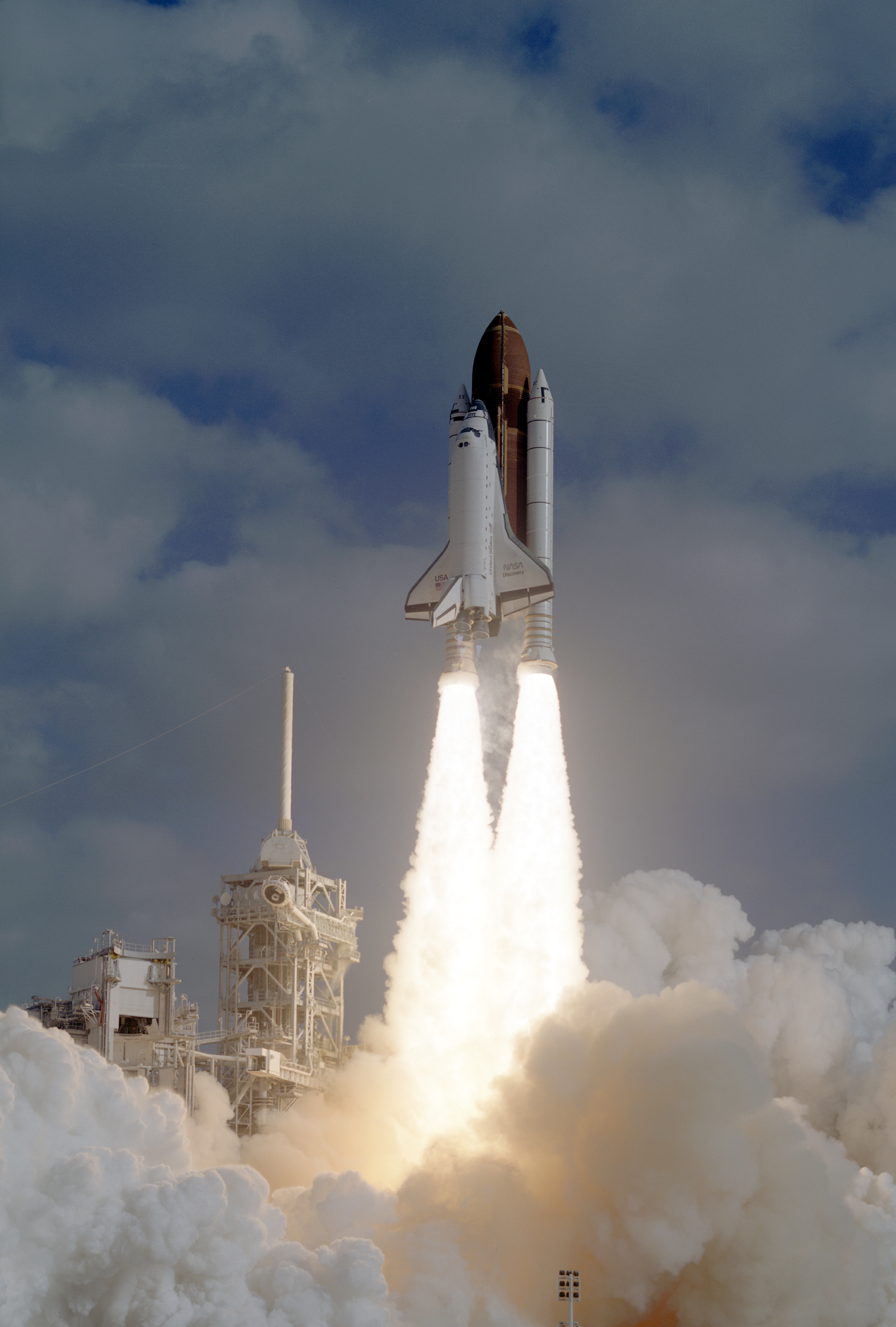
STS-31 launches to carry Hubble into orbit, 1990

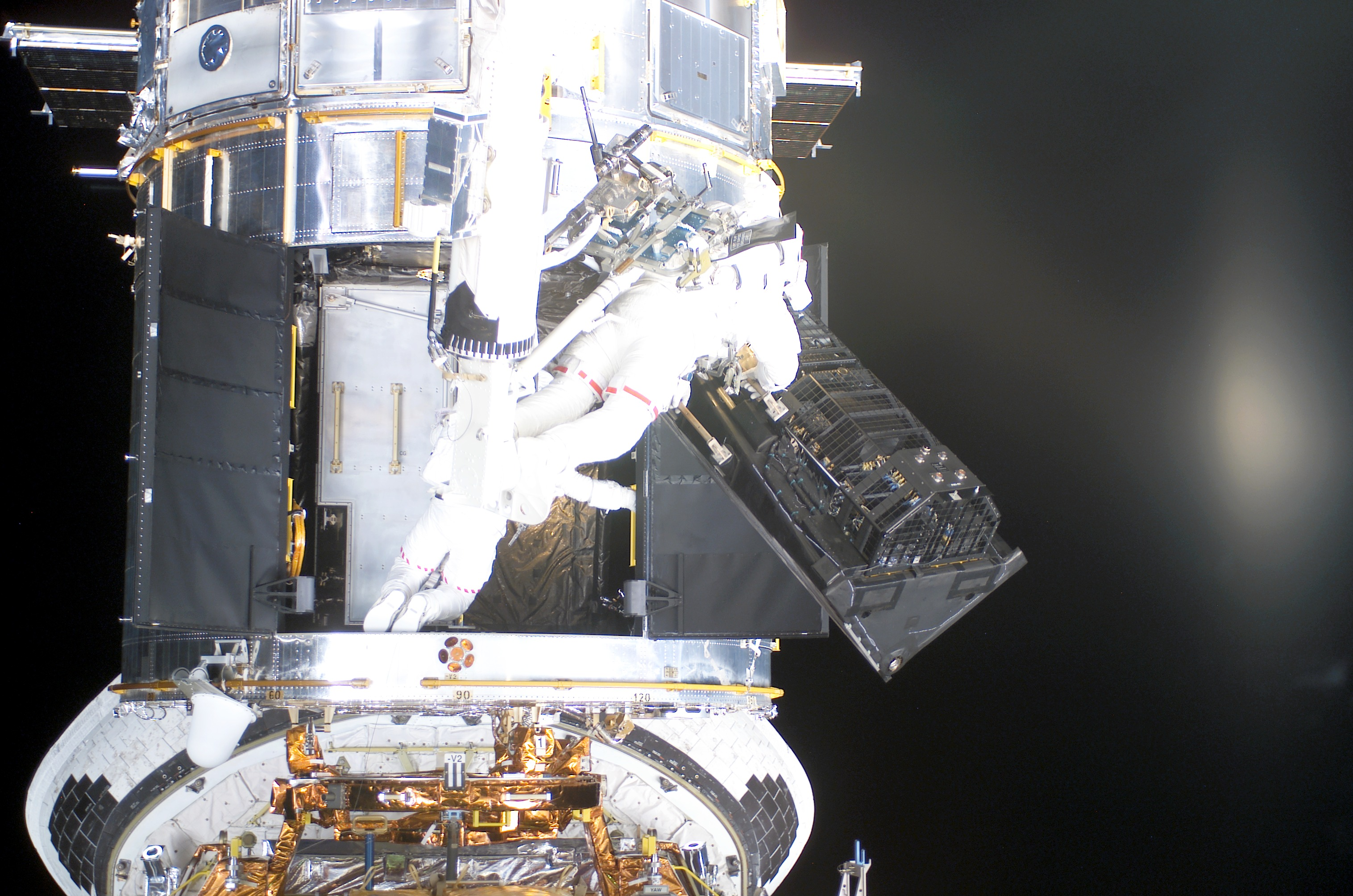
Astronauts remove the FOC to make room for the ACS instrument

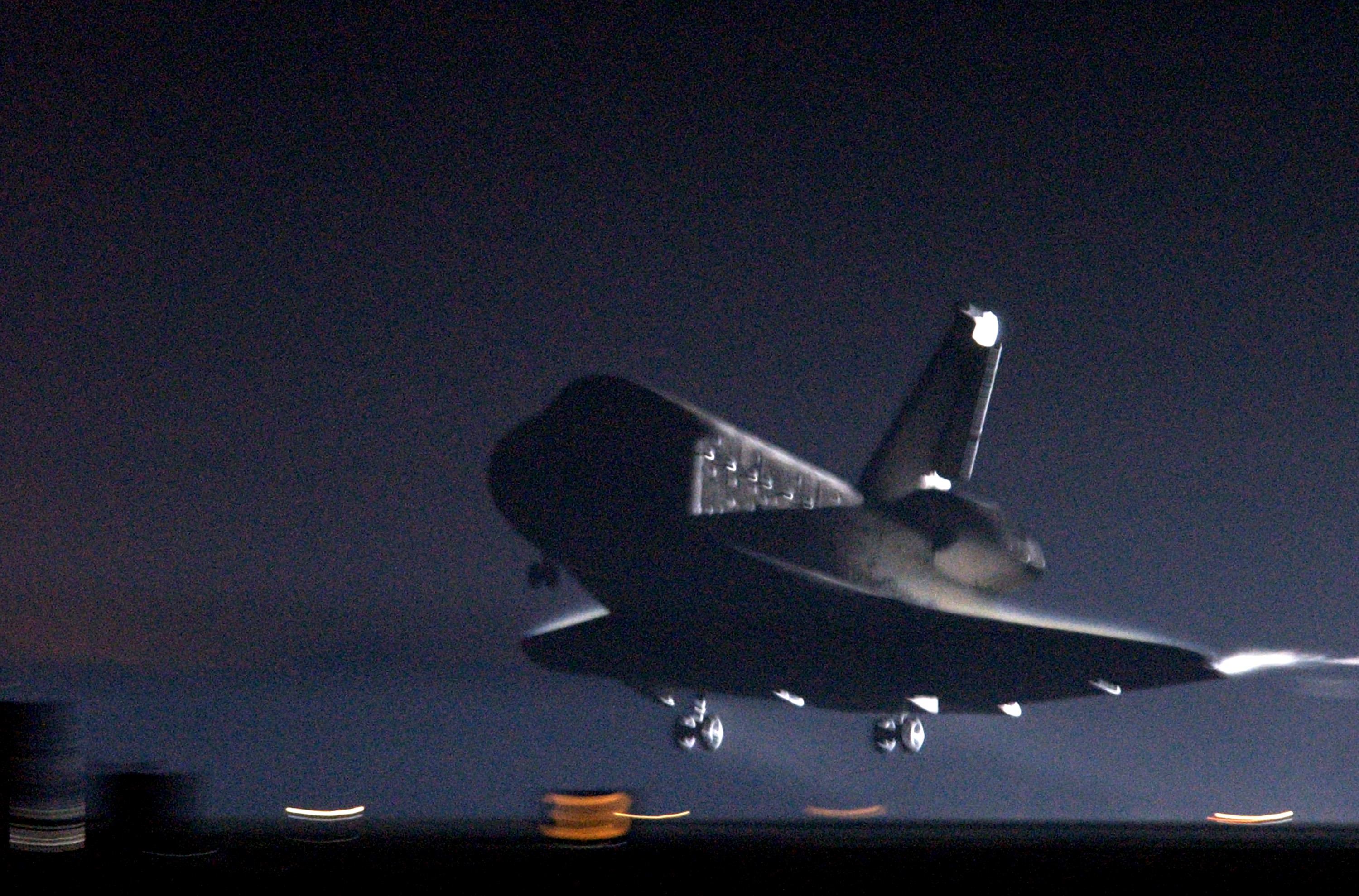
Columbia lands, returning FOC to Earth, 2002
