= Advanced Camera for Surveys =

Installed on HST March 2002

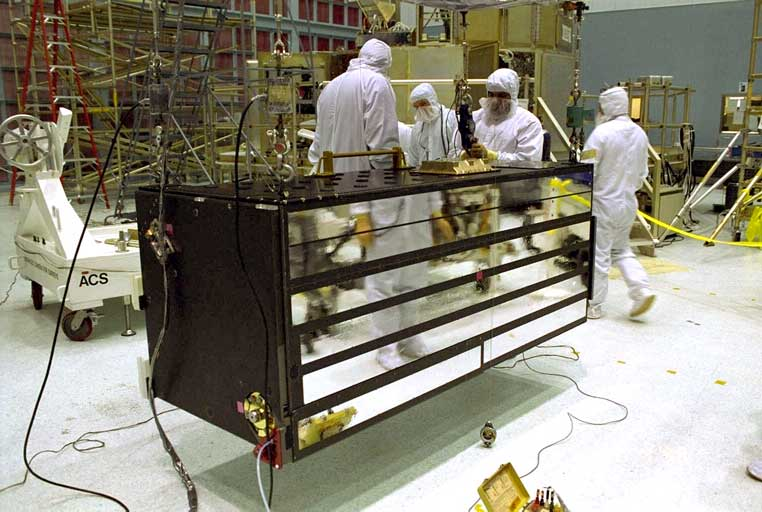
The Advanced Camera for Surveys in the clean room at the Goddard Space Flight Center in Maryland, prior to its installation on the Hubble Space Telescope

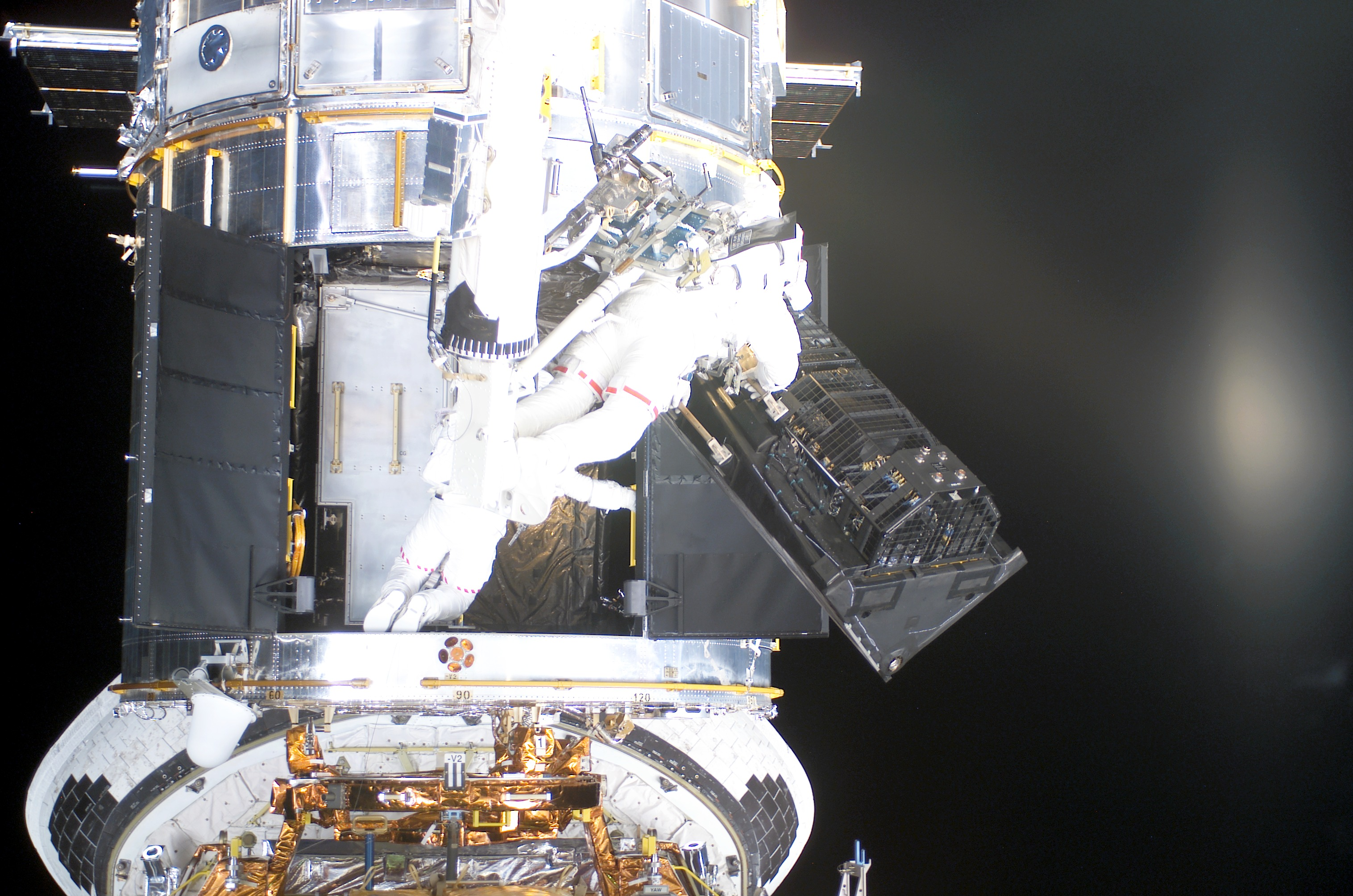
Astronauts remove the FOC to make room for the ACS in 2002

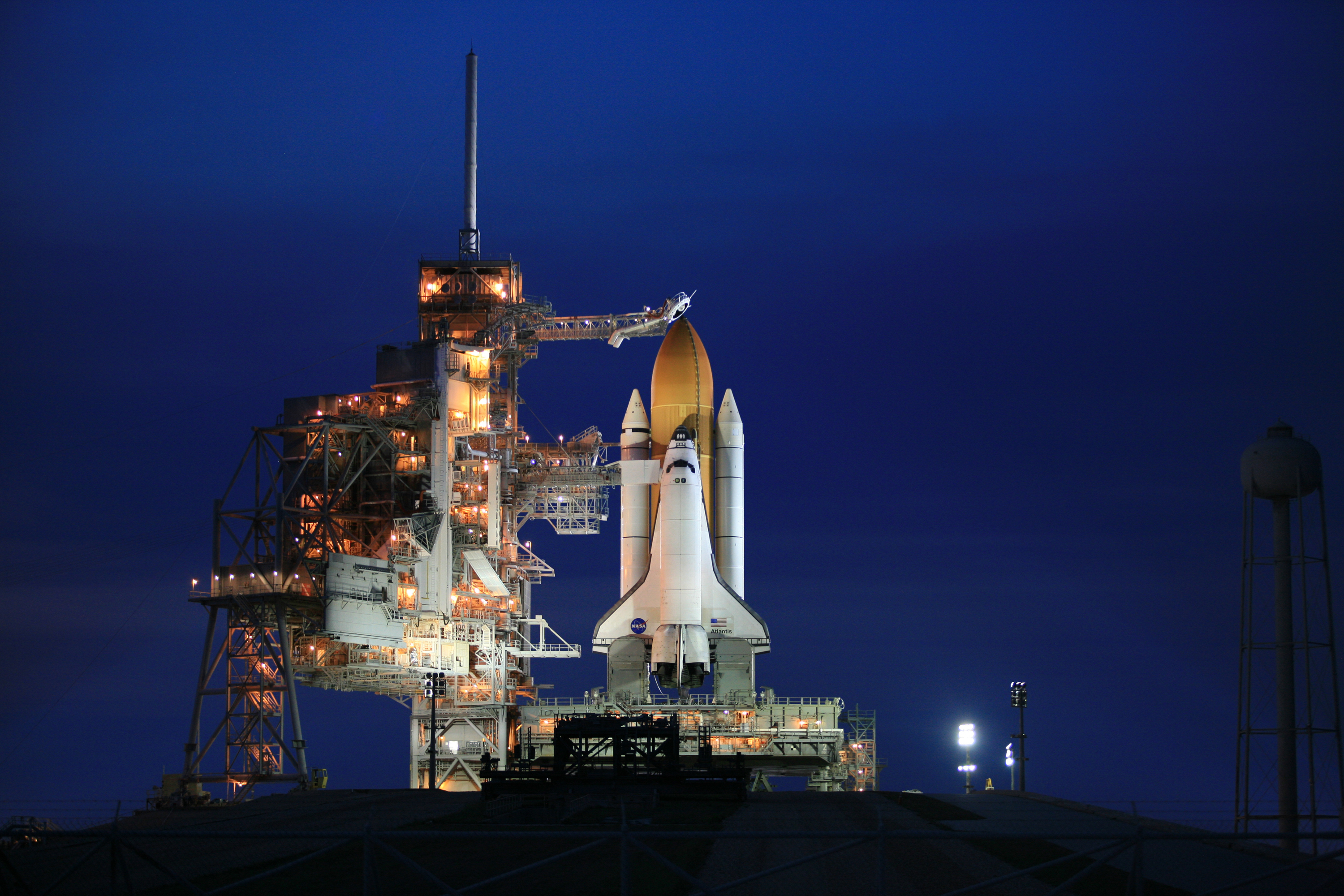
The STS-125, shown here on the launchpad, went on to repair the Advanced Camera for Surveys and returned the crew safely back to Earth

The Advanced Camera for Surveys (ACS) is a third-generation axial instrument aboard the Hubble Space Telescope (HST). The initial design and scientific capabilities of ACS were defined by a team based at Johns Hopkins University. ACS was assembled and tested extensively at Ball Aerospace & Technologies Corp. and the Goddard Space Flight Center and underwent a final flight-ready verification at the Kennedy Space Center before integration in the cargo bay of the Columbia orbiter. It was launched on March 1, 2002, as part of Servicing Mission 3B (STS-109) and installed in HST on March 7, replacing the Faint Object Camera (FOC), the last original instrument. ACS cost US$86 million at that time.

ACS is a highly versatile instrument that became the primary imaging instrument aboard HST. It offered several important advantages over other HST instruments: three independent, high-resolution channels covering the ultraviolet to the near-infrared regions of the spectrum, a large detector area and quantum efficiency, resulting in an increase in HST's discovery efficiency by a factor of ten, a rich complement of filters, and coronagraphic, polarimetric, and grism capabilities. The observations undertaken with ACS provided astronomers with a view of the Universe with uniquely high sensitivity, as exemplified by the Hubble Ultra-Deep Field, and encompass a wide range of astronomical phenomena, from comets and planets in the Solar System to the most distant quasars known.

== Channels and detectors ==
ACS includes three independent channels (one now disabled), each optimized for specific scientific tasks:

=== Wide Field Channel (WFC) ===
The WFC is the most utilized channel of ACS. Its detector consists of two butted 2048x4096, 15 μm/pixel charge-coupled devices (CCDs) for a total of 16 megapixels manufactured by Scientific Imaging Technologies (SITe). The WFC plate scale is 0.05″ per pixel and it has an effective field-of-view of 202″×202″. The spectral range of the WFC detector is 350–1100 nm.

An example of a use of this channel was SWEEPS, which found 16 candidate exoplanets in the Galactic core.

=== High-Resolution Channel (HRC) ===
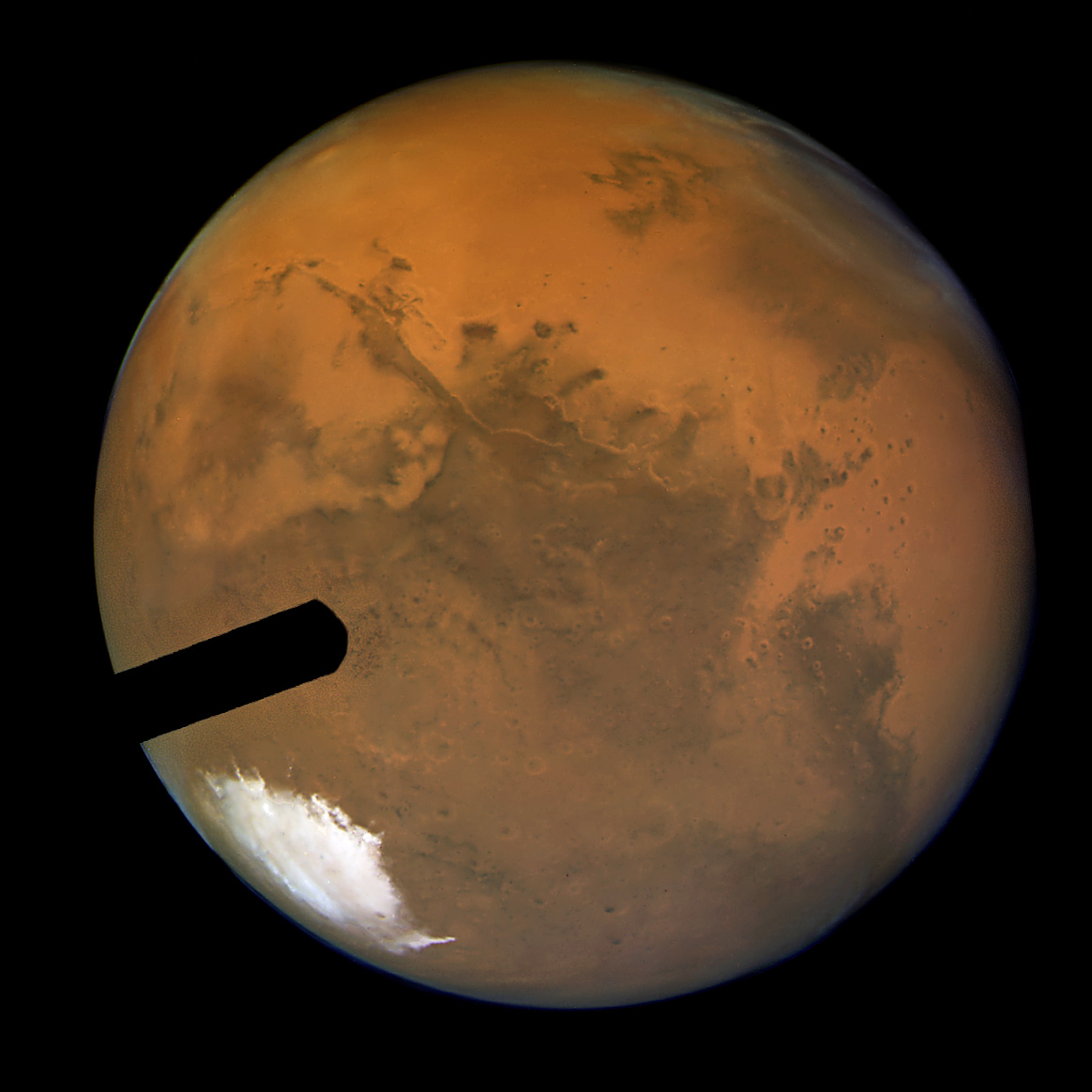
Hubble's ACS/HRC captures Mars during its 2003 opposition, yielding the sharpest visible-light color (RGB) photo yet taken from Earth. At about 8 km / pixel, various martian craters and markings are revealed. The ACS "Fastie finger" is blocking light on the left.

The HRC, which has been permanently disabled since 2007 due to an electrical fault, provided ultra-sharp views over a smaller field-of-view.

The HRC detector was a 1024×1024 SITe CCD which had a smaller field-of-view (26"×29") than the WFC but twice the spatial sampling (0.025" per pixel). This detector was also significantly more sensitive than the WFC at near-ultraviolet wavelengths (<350 nm).

The channel used two light suppression options for imaging faint objects around bright stars, improving the contrast of targets close to bright sources by tenfold. The first was a commandable coronagraphic mask that included two occulting spots, one of diameter 1.8" at the center of the field and the other of diameter 3.0" nearer to a corner. The first spot was the most popular of the two, for example, for imaging circumstellar disks around nearby bright stars or the host galaxies of luminous quasars. The second was the so-called Fastie Finger, 0.8" in width and 5" in length, located at the entrance of the HRC dewar window.

=== Solar Blind Channel (SBC) ===
The Multi Anode Microchannel Array (MAMA) of the SBC is a low-background photon-counting device optimized for the ultraviolet in the wavelength range of 115–170 nm. It consists of a photocathode, a microchannel plate, and an anode array. Its spatial sampling is 0.034"x0.030" per pixel and its field-of-view is 34.6"×30.0". The ACS SBC is in fact a flight spare from the Space Telescope Imaging Spectrograph (STIS).

== ACS problems and fixes 2006–2009 ==
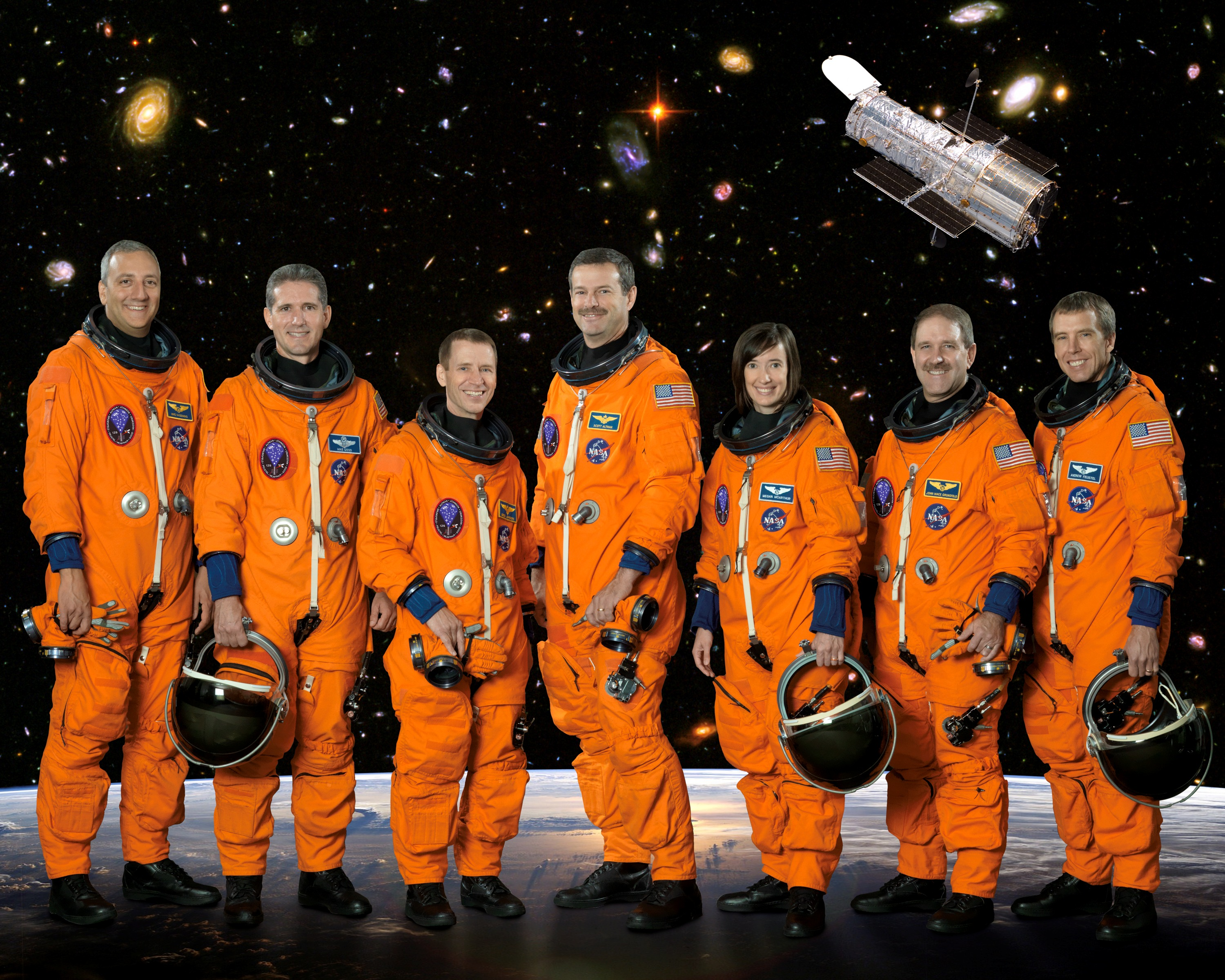
The astronaut crew that repaired ACS on its 2009 space shuttle mission, STS-125

On 25 June 2006 ACS suffered an electronic failure. It was powered up successfully on its redundant (side-2) electronics. The instrument subsystems, including the CCD detectors, proved to be working after engineering tests, and ACS resumed science operations on July 4, 2006. On 23 September 2006, the ACS again failed, though by 9 October the problem had been diagnosed and resolved.

On January 27, 2007, the ACS failed due to a short circuit in its backup power supply. The instrument's Solar Blind Channel (SBC) was returned to operation on 19 February 2007 using the side-1 electronics.

The Wide Field Channel (WFC) was returned to service by STS-125 in May 2009. The High Resolution Channel (HRC), however, remains offline.

== Gallery ==
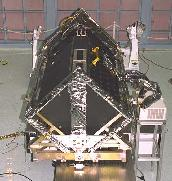
The ACS during assembly.

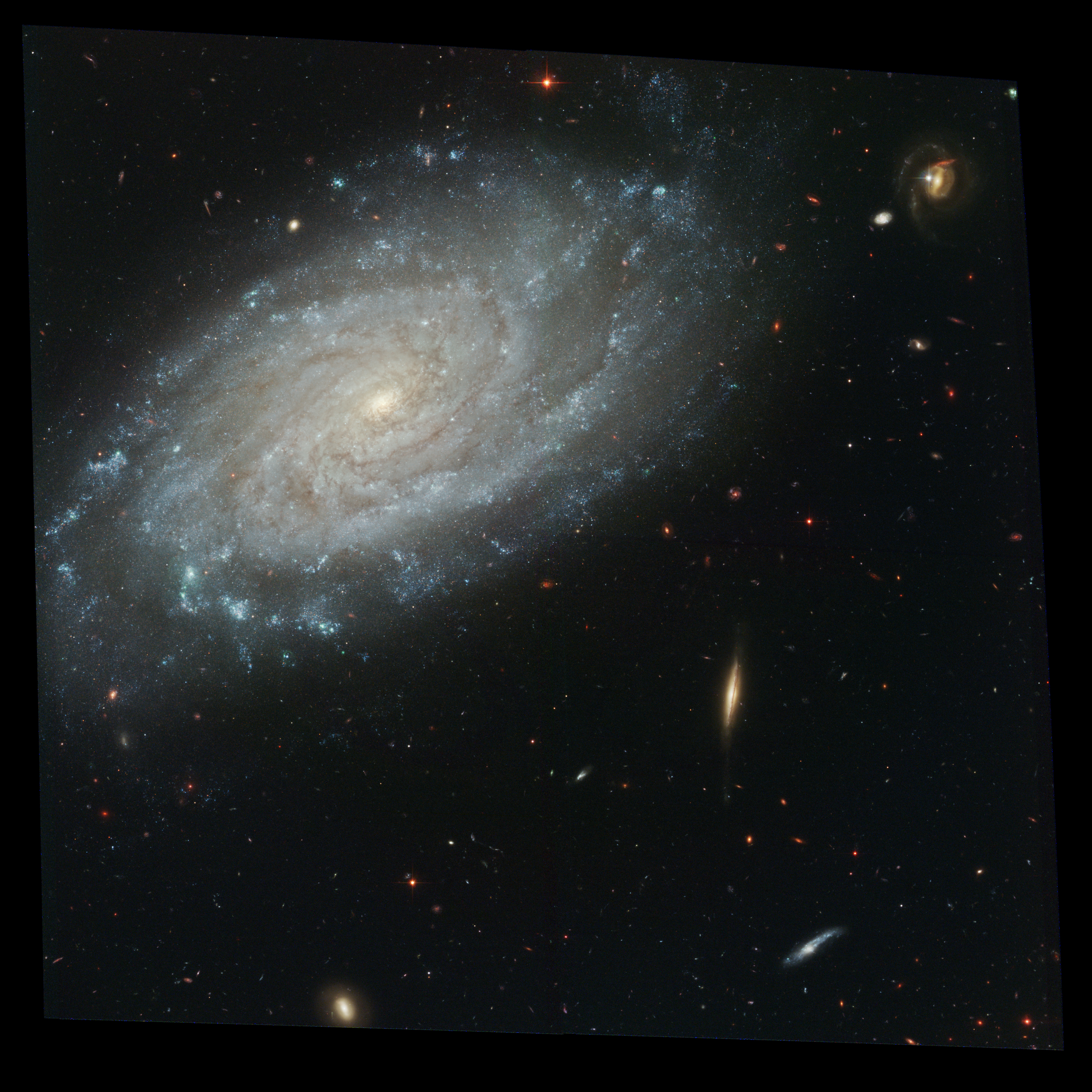
ACS Wide Field Channel (ACS/WFC) image of NGC 3370 from 2002.

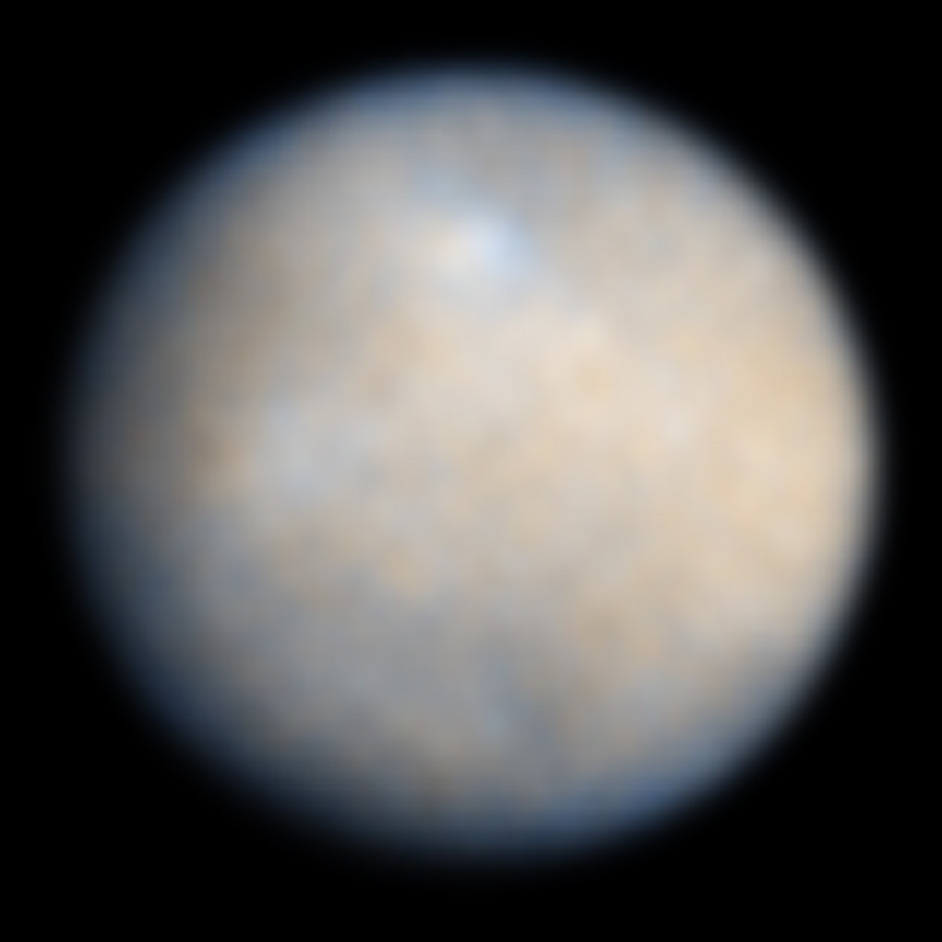
ACS High-Resolution Channel (ACS/HRC) image of Ceres from 2005.

== Filters and dispersers ==
ACS possesses a set of 38 filters and dispersers distributed among three wheels. Two of these wheels are shared by the HRC and WFC light paths while the third is dedicated to the SBC. The HRC and WFC elements consist of eleven broad-band filters, one medium-band filter, five narrow-band filters, three visible and three ultraviolet polarizers, one prism for the HRC, and one grism (580–1100 nm). Four of the filters have bandpasses in the near-ultraviolet and so can be used with the HRC only. The primary broad-band filters are equivalent to the u, g, r, i, and z filters of the ground-based Sloan Digital Sky Survey (SDSS). Five linear ramp filters divided into three individual segments each provide continuous imaging capability from 380 nm to 1070 nm and so ensure adequate sampling of emission lines over a large range in redshift. Only the middle segment is accessible to the HRC. The SBC wheel is populated with one medium-band filter (Lyα), five long-pass filters, and two objective prisms.

== Timeline ==
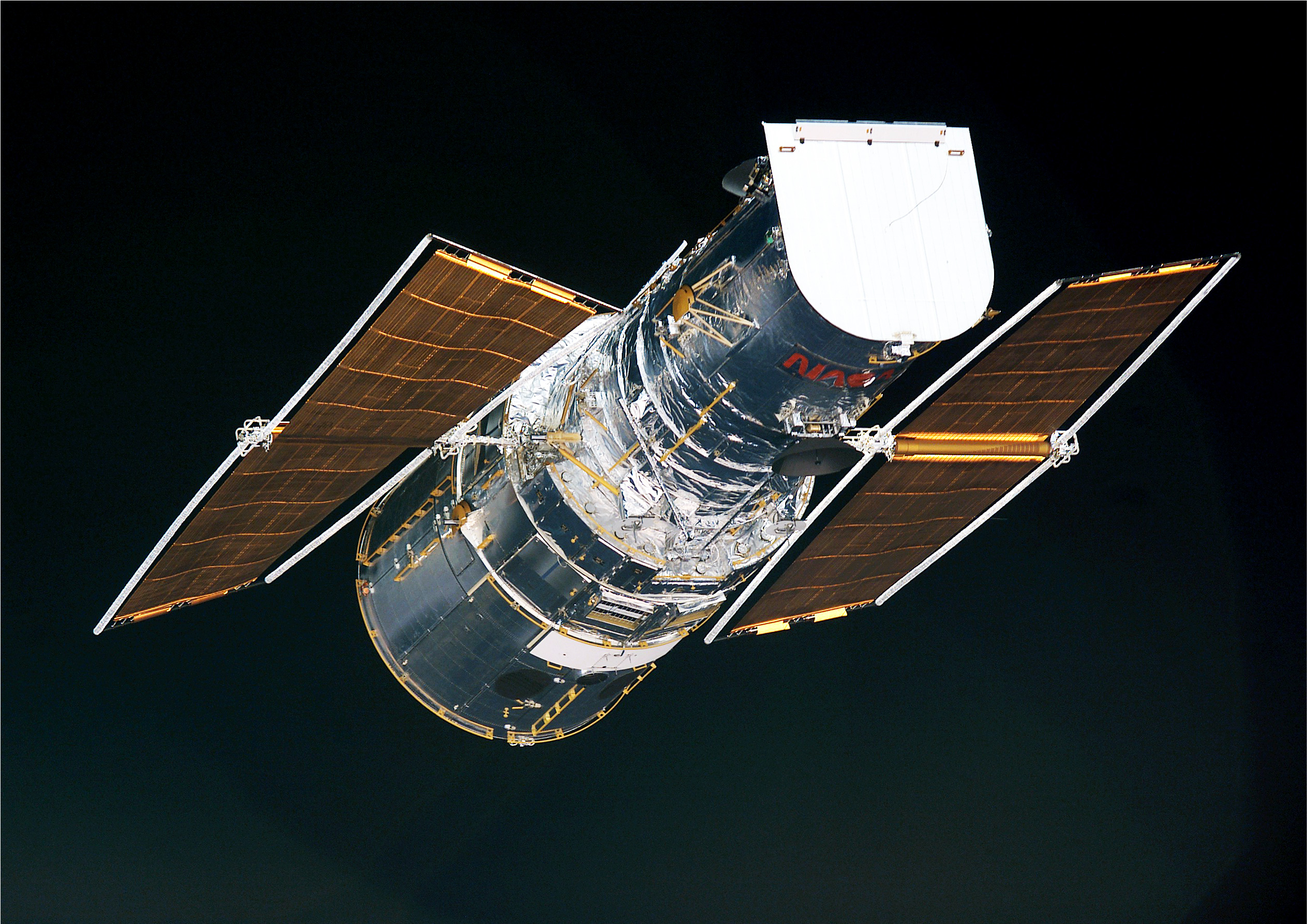
STS-109 rendezvous with Hubble Space Telescope, 2002

- March 7, 2002, ACS installed in the Hubble Space Telescope (STS-109)
- June 19, 2006; ACS/WFC and HRC go offline due to problem with Low Voltage Power Supply
- July 4, 2006 ACS resumed science operations by switching to back-up electronics
- 23 September 23, 2006, the ACS goes offline again
- October 9, 2006 ACS problem diagnosed and resolved.
- January 27, 2007 the ACS failed due to a short circuit in its backup power supply.
- 2009, ACS/WFC repaired (STS-125)

== See also ==
- Cosmic Origins Spectrograph
- Faint Object Camera
- Faint Object Spectrograph
- Goddard High Resolution Spectrograph
- Near Infrared Camera and Multi-Object Spectrometer
- Space Telescope Imaging Spectrograph
- Wide Field and Planetary Camera
- Wide Field and Planetary Camera 2
- Wide Field Camera 3
