= V4998 Sagittarii =

Luminous blue variable star in the constellation Sagittarius

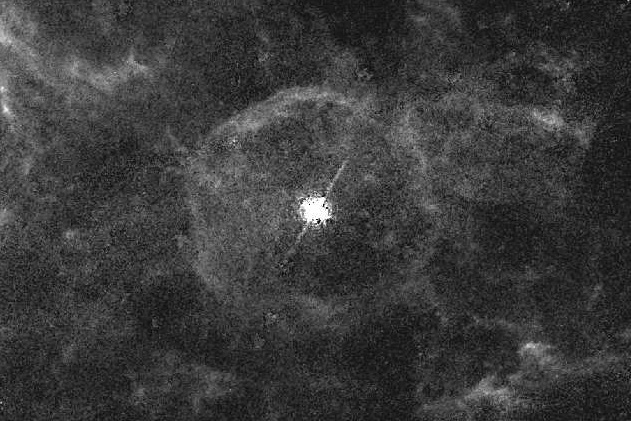
- V4998 Sagittarii and its surrounding shell nebula. The nebula appears as a transparent bubble-like body encircling the star. Credit: HST\NIMCOS

Observation data Epoch J2000 Equinox J2000
- Constellation: Sagittarius
- Right ascension: 17^{h} 46^{m} 05.625^{s}
- Declination: −28° 51′ 31.92″

Characteristics
- Evolutionary stage: LBV
- Apparent magnitude (B): 19.5
- Apparent magnitude (R): 17.2
- Apparent magnitude (J): 12.534
- Apparent magnitude (H): 9.239
- Apparent magnitude (K): 7.462
- Variable type: LBV

Astrometry
Distance	8,000 pc

Details
Radius	463 (Note: Applying the Stefan-Boltzmann Law with a nominal solar effective temperature of 5,772 K: $\sqrt{(5772/12000)^4 * 4,000,000} = 462.72$) R_{☉}
Luminosity	4,000,000 L_{☉}
Temperature	12,000 K

Other designations
- V4998 Sagittarii, LBV G0.120-0.048, LBV3, 2MASS J17460562-2851319, SSTGC 595621

Database references
SIMBAD	data

V4998 Sagittarii is a luminous blue variable star (LBV) in the constellation of Sagittarius. Located some 25,000 light-years away, the star is positioned about 7 pc (23 ly) away from a starburst cluster known as the Quintuplet Cluster. It has an ejection nebula measuring over 0.8 pc in diameter, formed 5,000–10,000 years ago through large eruptions. The star has a large mass comparable to the Pistol Star and a luminosity of around 4 million times the Sun (L_{☉}). This places the star as one of the most massive and luminous stars known.

== Observational history ==
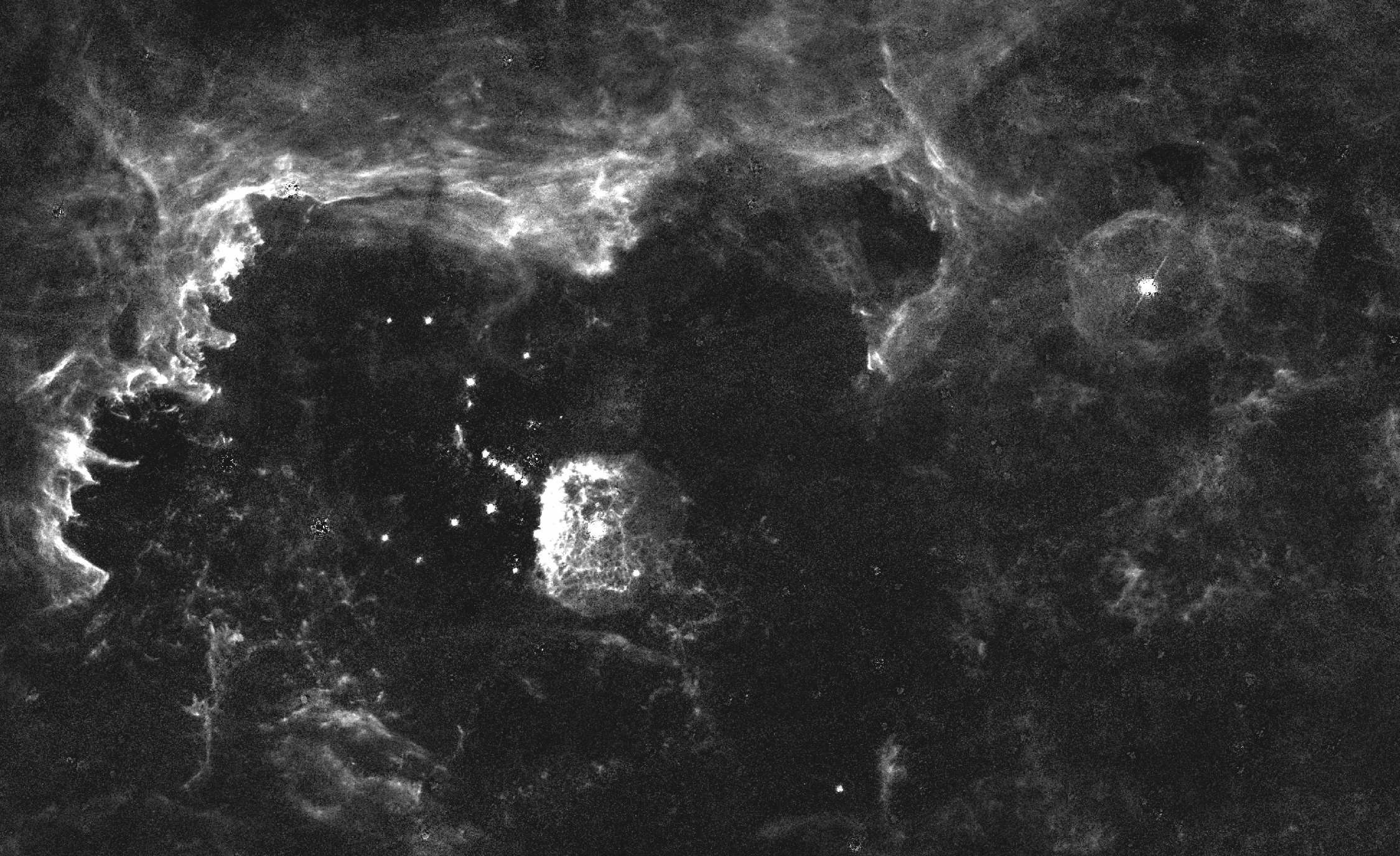
Quintuplet cluster region centred on the Pistol Star, with V4998 Sgr at top right

The star was first discovered in a 1993 survey that searched for bright near-infrared sources within 0.55°^{2} of the Galactic Center. The survey used 1–20 micron photometry and used a two channel InSb detector on the 1 meter ANU telescope in Australia. 50 objects were targeted and most of them had bolometric magnitudes below -5. The star itself was observed in May 1987. Its position, JHKLNMQ magnitudes, right ascension, declination, and silicate absorption were noted. The survey was conducted by Tetsuya Nagata, A. R. Hyland, S. M. Straw, Shuji Sato, and Kimiaki Kawara. The survey named the star NHS93 22; NHS standing for the three leading scientists in the survey (Nagata, Hyland, and Straw), 93 signifying the date of discovery, and 22 indicating that it was the 22nd star observed.

The next observation was made by the 2MASS survey, which took place in 1997–2001. The star was designated 2MASS J17460562-2851319 and its position, luminosity, and JHKs magnitudes were catalogued. After that, the star was observed in a 2001 survey called the Study of Long Period Variables stars near the Galactic Centre. The survey named the star GMC2001 10-1, GMC standing for Glass, Matsumoto, and Carter. It was observed by the Infrared Array Camera on board the Spitzer Space Telescope in a 2008 survey covering 2.0 by 1.4 degrees (280 by 210 pc) and was given the name SSTGC 595621. It was also observed by a 2009 near-infrared survey that targeted the Galactic Center. The star was designated MKN2009 in that survey, MKN standing for the three leading scientists (Matsunaga, Kawadu, and Nishiyama) and 2009 specifying the date of the survey.

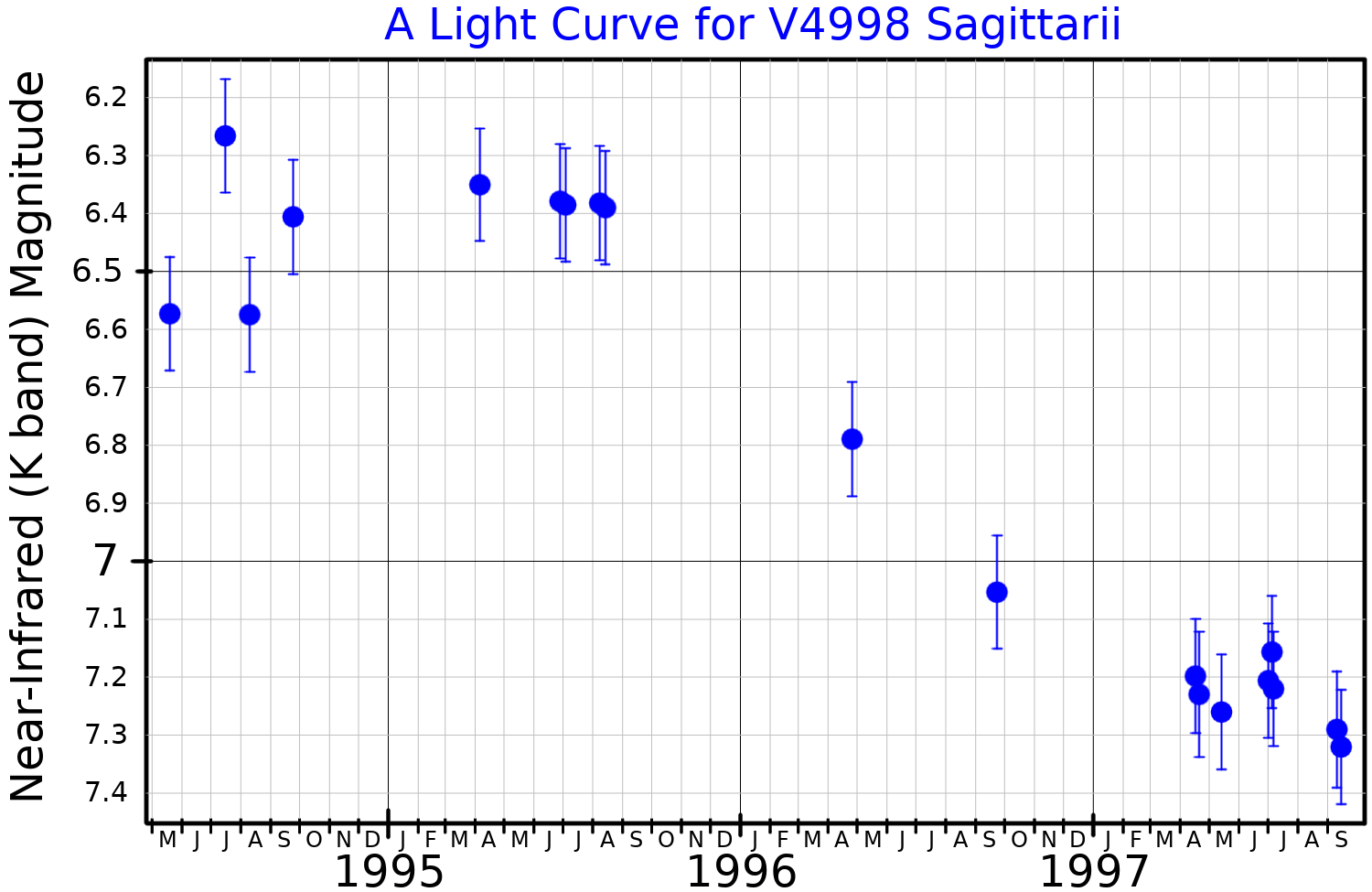
A near-infrared (K band) light curve for V4998 Sagittarii, adapted from Mauerhan et al. (2010)

A narrowband imaging survey of the Galactic Center region conducted by the Hubble Space Telescope (HST) Near Infrared Camera and Multi Object Spectrometer (NICMOS) revealed LBV G0.120-0.048 as a strong source of Paschen-alpha (Paschen-α) emission which exceeded that of the Pistol Star. Therefore, the star was selected for spectroscopy. The survey, which was conducted in 2010, confirmed that the star was a luminous blue variable and the star was designated LBV G0.120-0.048, LBV meaning luminous blue variable and G0.120-0.048 standing for its Galactic coordinates. It was also found through the use of Pα imaging that the star had a large ejection nebula with a diameter over 0.8 pc which was ejected by it 5000–10,000 years ago through large eruptions. The star's spectrum was studied and it was found that the spectrum was similar to the Pistol Star so a mass similar to the Pistol Star was assumed. The extinction rates were measured and a luminosity of about 4,000,000 L_{☉} was obtained. It also has the designation MMC2010 from a 2010 survey, MMC standing for the three leading scientists of the survey, Mauerhan, Morris, and Cotera. In 2011, a survey led by Dong, Wang, and Cotera reached for stars in the Galactic Center that emitted Paschen-α. The stars targeted were the ones detected from the HST/NICMOS Paschen-α survey of the Galactic Center. V4998 Sagittarii was one of the stars observed and it was given another designation of DWC2011 92.

In 2014 a group decided to study the LBVs in the Quintuplet Cluster. The mass of the star's nebula was measured at 6.2 M_{☉}. Also measured was the star's effective temperature and it was found to be 12,000 K. The star was designated LBV3 in that survey because it was the third LBV in the Quintuplet Cluster.

== Characteristics ==
V4998 Sgr's high mass compresses its core and accelerates fusion primarily by the CNO cycle which leads to a luminosity of about 4,000,000 L_{☉} and a temperature of 12,000 K. It boasts a large ejection nebula with a diameter of about 0.8 parsecs (2.5 ly) and a mass of 6.2 M_{☉}. Since comparable nebulae typically last no more than 10,000 years, V4998 Sagittarii is presumed to have undergone a massive eruption 5,000–10,000 years ago.

The star is a projected 7 pc (23 ly) away from the Quintuplet starburst cluster, which lies in the direction of the Galactic Center. The cluster contains around 100 O-type stars and several Wolf–Rayet stars. There are also two other luminous blue variables besides V4998 Sagittarii: the Pistol Star and qF362.

== Evolution ==
The star's high mass loss rate combined with its eruptions will strip off its hydrogen layers and expose a hot helium core. It will proceed to the Wolf–Rayet sequence. It will eventually start fusing heavy elements in its core, and when it develops a large iron core the star will collapse in on itself and explode as a Type Ib or Ic supernovae. Depending on the amount of mass lost before the supernova explosion, the remnant will be a neutron star or black hole. A black hole is predicted for the most massive stars such as this one.
