= VII Zw 31 =

Galaxy in the constellation Camelopardalis

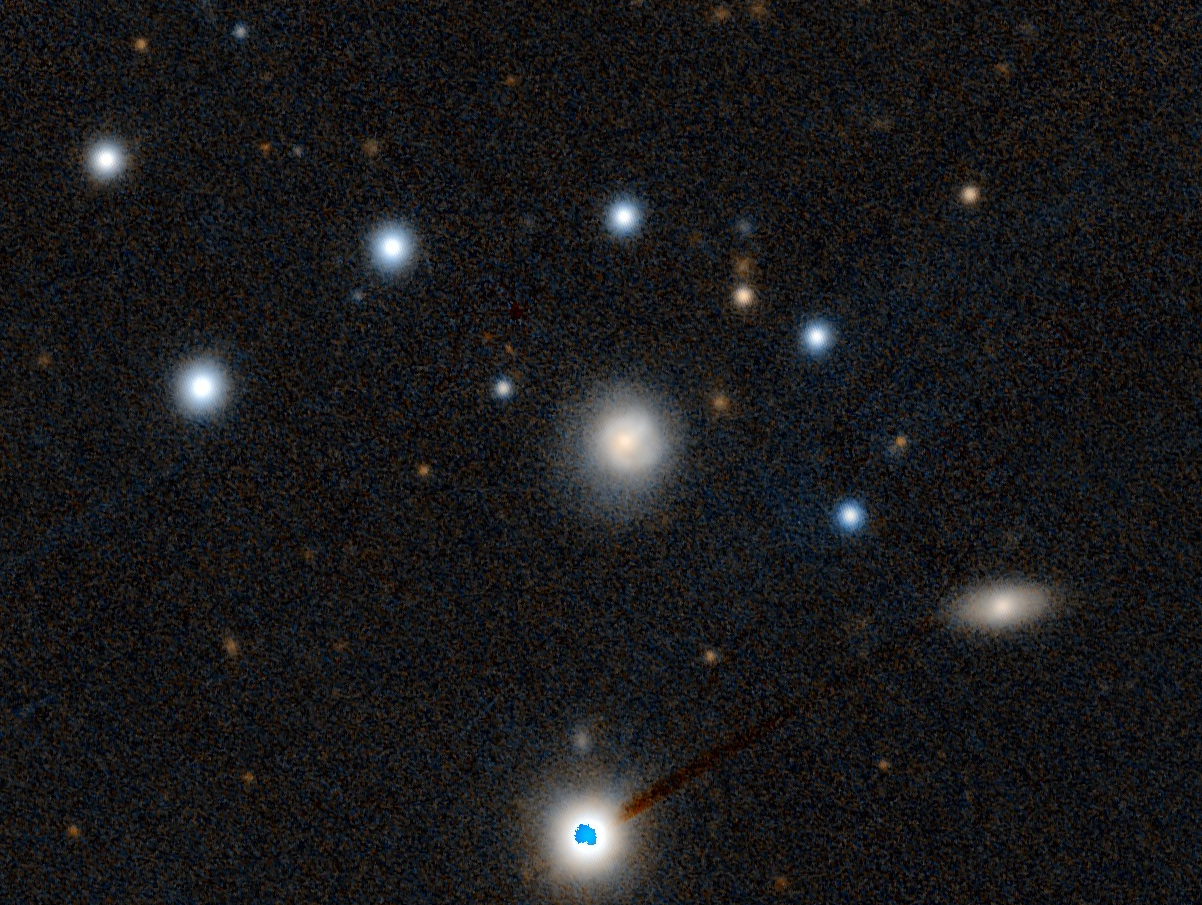
- VII Zw 31 captured with PanSTARRS

Observation data (J2000 epoch)
- Constellation: Camelopardalis
- Right ascension: 05^{h} 16^{m} 46.44^{s}
- Declination: +79° 40′ 12.43″
- Redshift: 0.053670
- Heliocentric radial velocity: 16,090 ± 9 km/s
- Distance: 781.4 ± 54.7 Mly (239.57 ± 16.77 Mpc)
- magnitude (J): 12.73

Characteristics
- Type: HII; LIRG
- Size: ~129,000 ly (39.4 kpc) (estimated)

Other designations
- IRAS 05083+7936, PGC 17034, NVSS J051646+794012, C-GOALS 03

VII Zw 31 is an ultraluminous infrared galaxy located in the constellation of Camelopardalis. The redshift of the galaxy is $z = 0.053$ and it was first discovered by the Swiss astronomer Fritz Zwicky in 1971, who described it as a blue object with a compact spherical appearance. It was also observed by J.H. Fairclough in March 1986 from an IRAS survey.

== Description ==
VII Zw 31 is an irregular galaxy, depicted to have a fuzzy blob appearance. It has an object located 20 arcseconds in the northwest direction from it, either being described as a companion or a galaxy merger remnant. Observations made by the near infrared camera and multi-object spectrometer (NICMOS) aboard the Hubble Space Telescope (HST) found that the galaxy has asymmetric spiral arms located in the central nucleus and multiple star clusters in its galactic disk.

Evidence based on both color and surface brightness profiles found that the central regions of the galaxy display signs of reddening, which is contributed by the presence of a dust lane. There are also detections of narrow emission lines in its optical spectrum. The star formation rate of the galaxy has been calculated as 90 M_{☉} per year.

A study in 1987 found that VII Zw 31 has detections of carbon oxide millimeter-wave emission. When observed, the total luminosity of the emission is estimated to be $1.1 \times 10^{10} \text{ K km s}^{-1} \text{ pc}^2$, making this 35 times more luminous than the carbon oxide millimeter-wave emission in the Milky Way and the most out of the observed galaxies. The total molecular hydrogen mass of the galaxy has been estimated as $5 \times 10^{10} \text{ M}_{\odot}$. A rotating molecular ring is suggested to be present inside the galaxy.
