= Shūji Satō =

Shūji Satō may refer to:

- Shūji Satō (shogi)
- Shuji Sato (astronomer)
