= V4650 Sagittarii =

Luminous blue variable star in the constellation Sagittarius

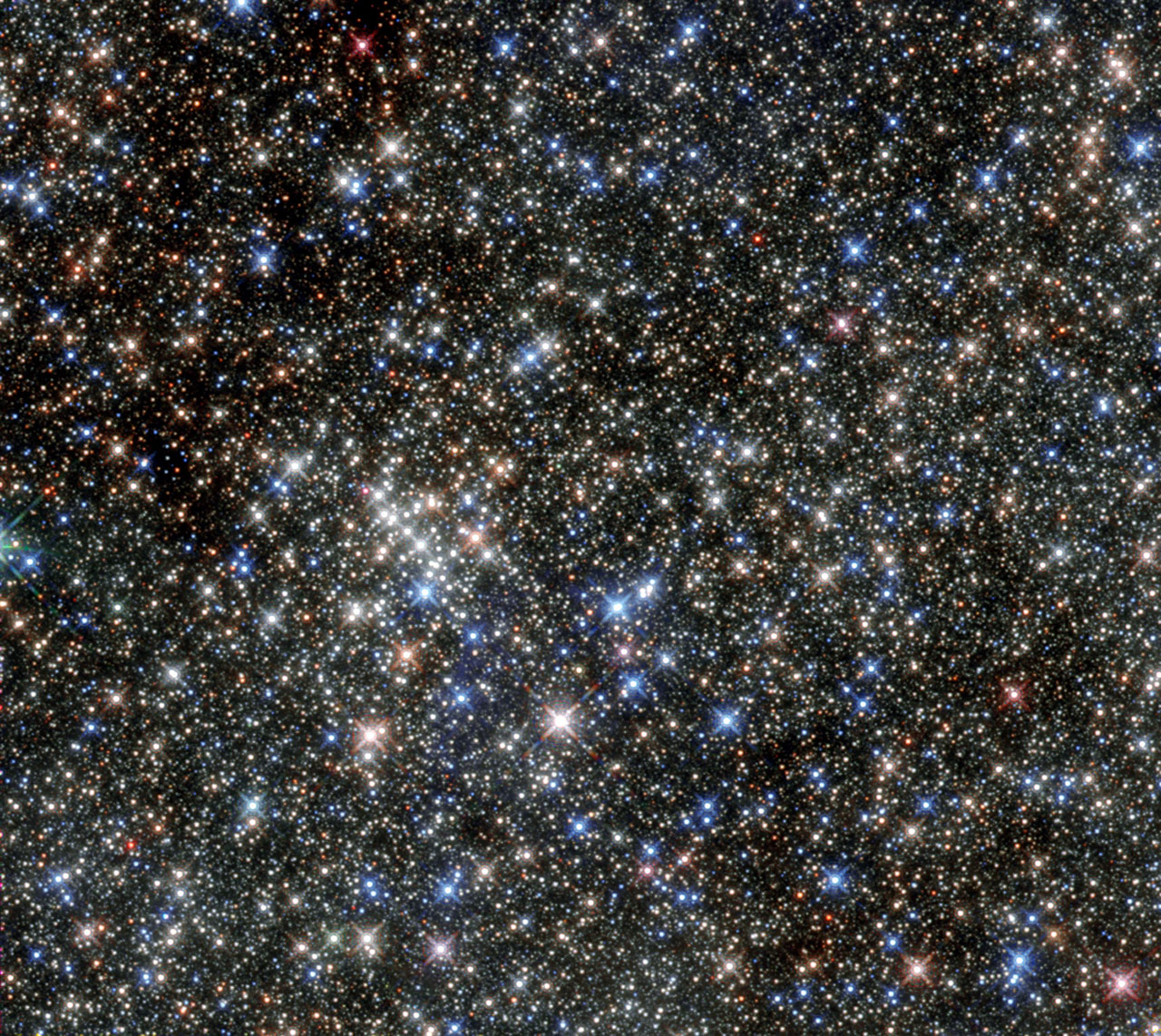
- V4650 Sgr is the very bright object just off the left edge of this image of the Quintuplet Cluster, with only its diffraction spikes visible. Credit: HST\NIMCOS (WFC3)

Observation data Epoch J2000 Equinox J2000
- Constellation: Sagittarius
- Right ascension: 17^{h} 46^{m} 17.982^{s}
- Declination: −28° 49′ 03.46″

Characteristics
- Evolutionary stage: LBV
- Spectral type: LBV
- Apparent magnitude (B): 19.3
- Apparent magnitude (R): 16.4
- Apparent magnitude (J): 12.310
- Apparent magnitude (H): 8.970
- Apparent magnitude (K): 7.090
- Variable type: LBV

Astrometry
Distance	8,000 pc

Details
Mass	46 M_{☉}
Radius	350 R_{☉}
Luminosity	1,770,000 L_{☉}
Temperature	11,300 K

Other designations
- V4650 Sagittarii, qF 362, 2MASS J17461798-2849034, SSTGC 629806

Database references
SIMBAD	data

V4650 Sagittarii (qF362) is a luminous blue variable star (LBV) in the constellation of Sagittarius. Located some 25,000 light years away, the star is positioned on the edge of a starburst cluster known as the Quintuplet Cluster.

== Discovery ==
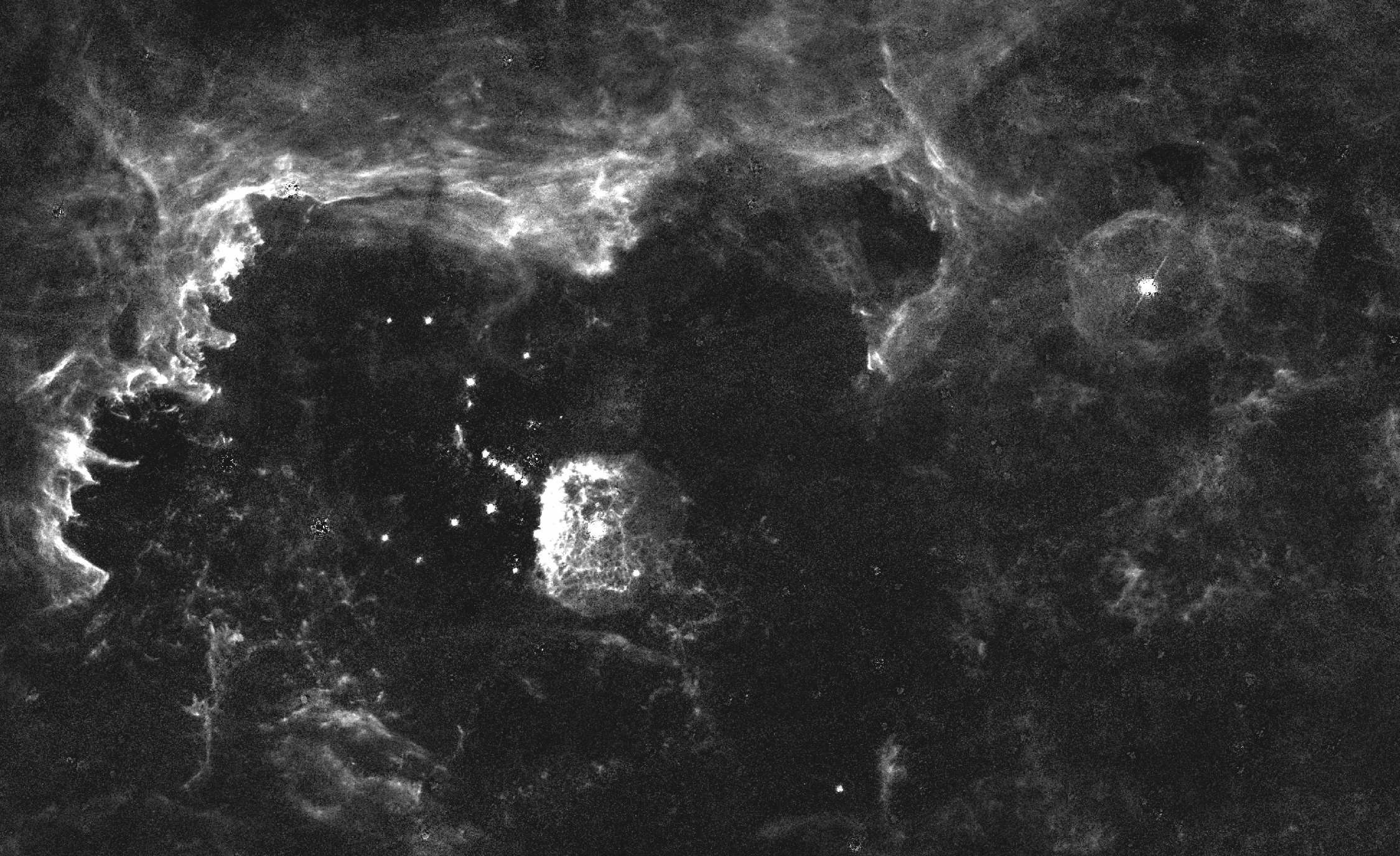
Quintuplet Cluster region, with V4650 Sgr to the left of the Pistol Nebula (annotated in full-size image)

V4650 Sgr was first catalogued in 1996 as star 362 in a list of stars in the Galactic Center region near the Quintuplet Cluster. The acronym qF is used for stars in the list and so the star name is qF 362. The acronym FMM is also used, hence FMM 362. The LBV nature of qF 362 was not recognised until 1999. It is one of three LBVs close to the Quintuplet Cluster, all highly luminous stars.

V4650 was discovered using infrared telescopes. It is extremely faint at optical wavelengths due to interstellar extinction. The 2MASS survey recorded it at 17th magnitude in red light and 19th magnitude in blue light, while it is a 7th magnitude object in K band infrared.

== Properties ==
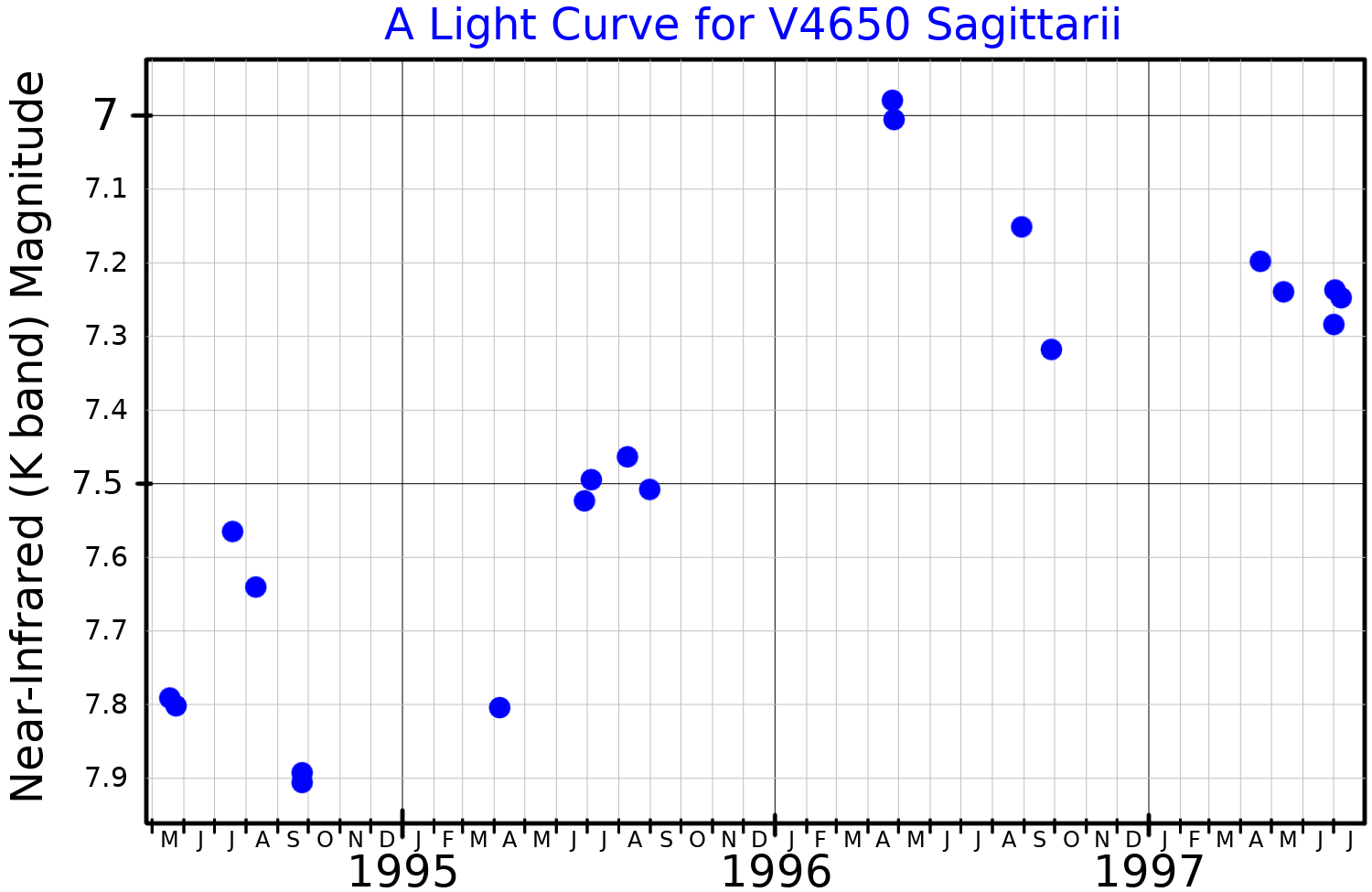
A near-infrared (K band) light curve for V4650 Sagittarii, adapted from Glass et al. (1999)

V4650 Sgr is calculated to be one of the most luminous stars known, at 1,700,000 L_{☉}. It is considered to be a bona-fide luminous blue variable, although it has not been observed to change temperature from the S Doradus minimum strip to a cooler outburst state. The infrared brightness has varied between magnitude 7.0 and 7.9. It is calculated to have a temperature of 11,300 K and a radius of 350 R_{☉}. Unlike both the two nearby LBVs, V4650 Sgr has no detectable associated nebulosity.
