= Quintuplet Cluster =

Dense star cluster of massive young stars in the constellation of Sagittarius

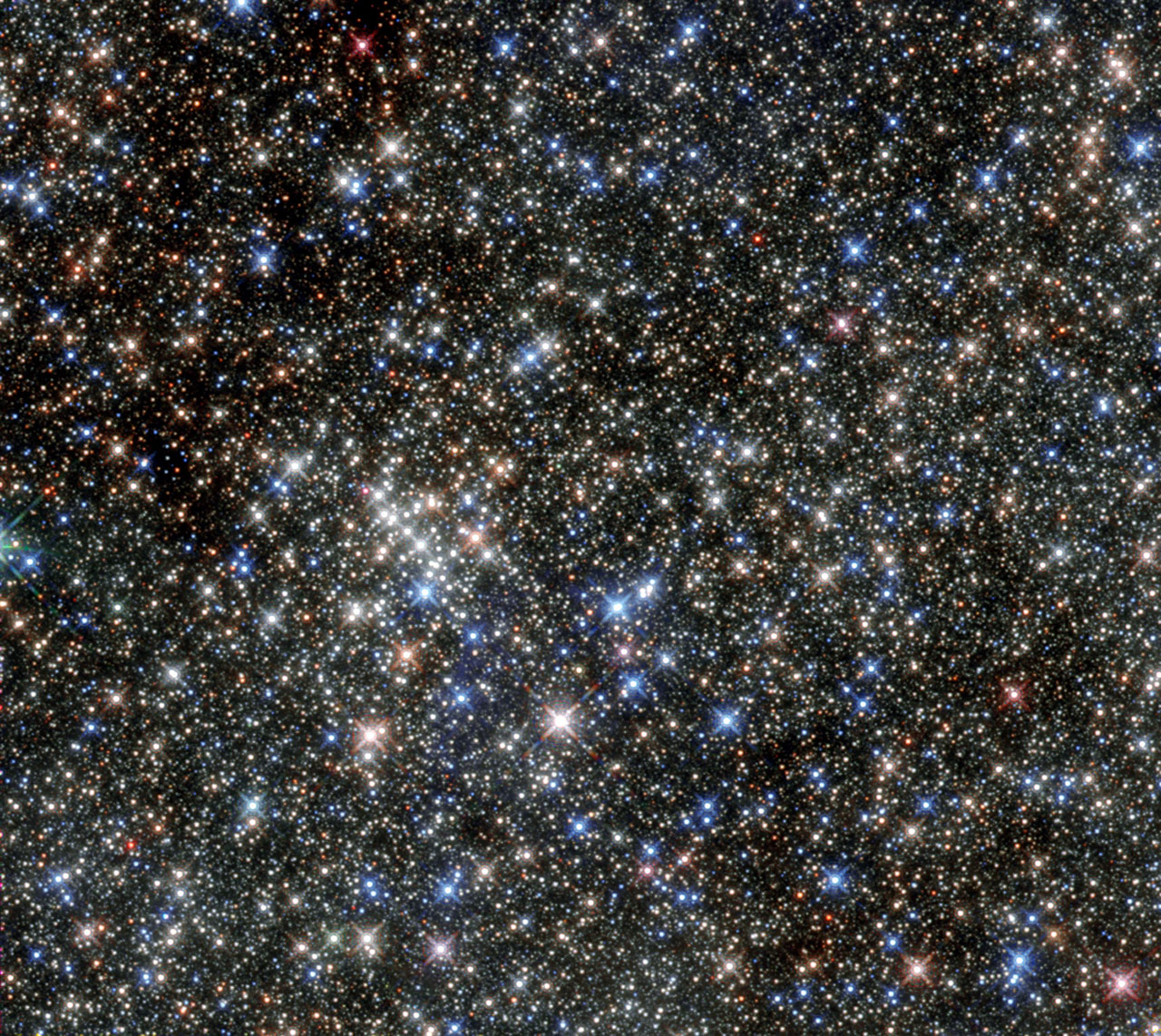
- Infrared image of the Quintuplet Cluster; Credit: ESA/Hubble & NASA

Observation data (J2000. epoch)
- Right ascension: 17^{h} 46^{m} 13.9^{s}
- Declination: −28° 49′ 48″
- Distance: 26 kly (8 kpc)
- Apparent dimensions (V): 50" (2 pc)

Physical characteristics
- Mass: 10,000 M_{☉}
- Estimated age: 4.8 million years
- Dense cluster of massive young stars near the Galactic Center. Optically obscured.
- Other designations: IRAS 17430-2848, G000.16-00.06

Associations
- Constellation: Sagittarius

The Quintuplet Cluster is a dense cluster of massive young stars about 100 light years from the Galactic Center (GC). Its name comes from the fact it has five prominent infrared sources residing in it. Along with the Arches Cluster it is one of two in the immediate GC region. Due to heavy extinction by dust in the vicinity, it is invisible to optical observation and must be studied in the X-ray, radio, and infrared bands. It is classified as an infrared cluster

The Quintuplet is less compact than the nearby Arches Cluster, with fewer of the most massive and luminous stars, but it does have the distinction of hosting two of the extremely rare luminous blue variables, (LBVs), the Pistol Star and the less well-known qF 362 (aka V4650 Sgr), and a third, V4998 Sagittarii, just a few parsecs away. It also contains a number of red supergiants, all suggesting a slightly more evolved cluster around 4 million years old.

== Discovery and naming ==
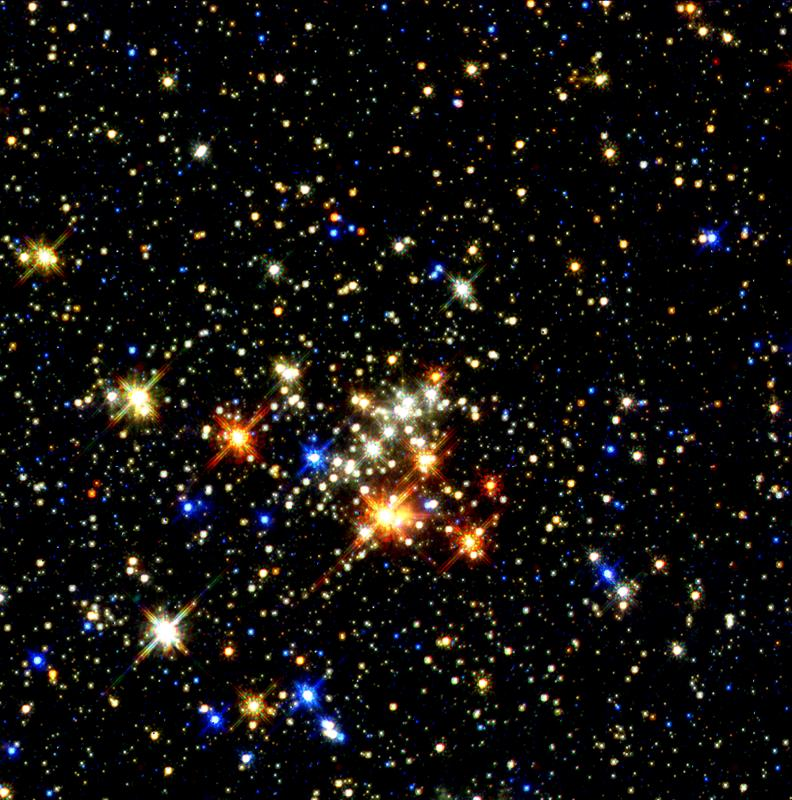
The trapezium of four bright red stars just below center, plus one to the left, are the original Quintuplet (HST/NICMOS image)

The Quintuplet was originally identified in 1983 as a pair of infra-red sources in a 2.5 micron survey of the galactic center. These two sources were numbered 3 and 4, and later referred to with the acronym GCS for Galactic Center Source. GCS-3 was later resolved into four sources, labelled I–IV, that together with GCS-4 formed a compact quintuplet of unusually bright small objects. They were assumed to be young hot luminous stars surrounded by dust shells and therefore extremely reddened.

In 1990, a total of 15 sources in the Quintuplet region were studied in more detail at several wavelengths, later referred to by Q or GMM (after the authors Glass, Moneti, and Moorwood) numbers. The original five stars were identified as numbers Q1, Q2, Q3, Q4, and Q9, with additional sources Q5 and Q6 identified as part of the same cluster. They were still considered to be protostars reddened by surrounding dust.

In 1994, several stars were identified as having broad helium emission lines in their spectra, and some showed narrow hydrogen emission lines. This was completely unexpected for protostars, instead suggesting the objects were much more evolved stars. Shortly afterwards two emission line stars were classified as Wolf–Rayet stars, and a third as an LBV that was thought to be one of the most luminous stars in the galaxy. A small number of red supergiants were also identified, narrowing the likely age of the cluster.

In 1999, a study of nearly 600 stars in the cluster showed that the Quintuplet contained more Wolf–Rayet stars than any known cluster, as well as a second LBV. The numbers from this survey are referred to as qF, or sometimes as FMM after all three authors (but not QMM). A 2008 study of the cluster used LHO numbers for the members and clarified the status of the unusual reddened Wolf–Rayet stars as WC stars (a subtype of Wolf-Rayet stars with strong carbon-oxygen emission lines in their spectra) surrounded by dust presumed to be formed from colliding winds between the WR component and a less evolved OB companion.

The cluster was also catalogued as a first magnitude "stellar" source at 4.2 microns in the Air Force Geophysics Lab survey and given the number 2004 (AFGL 2004).

== Properties ==
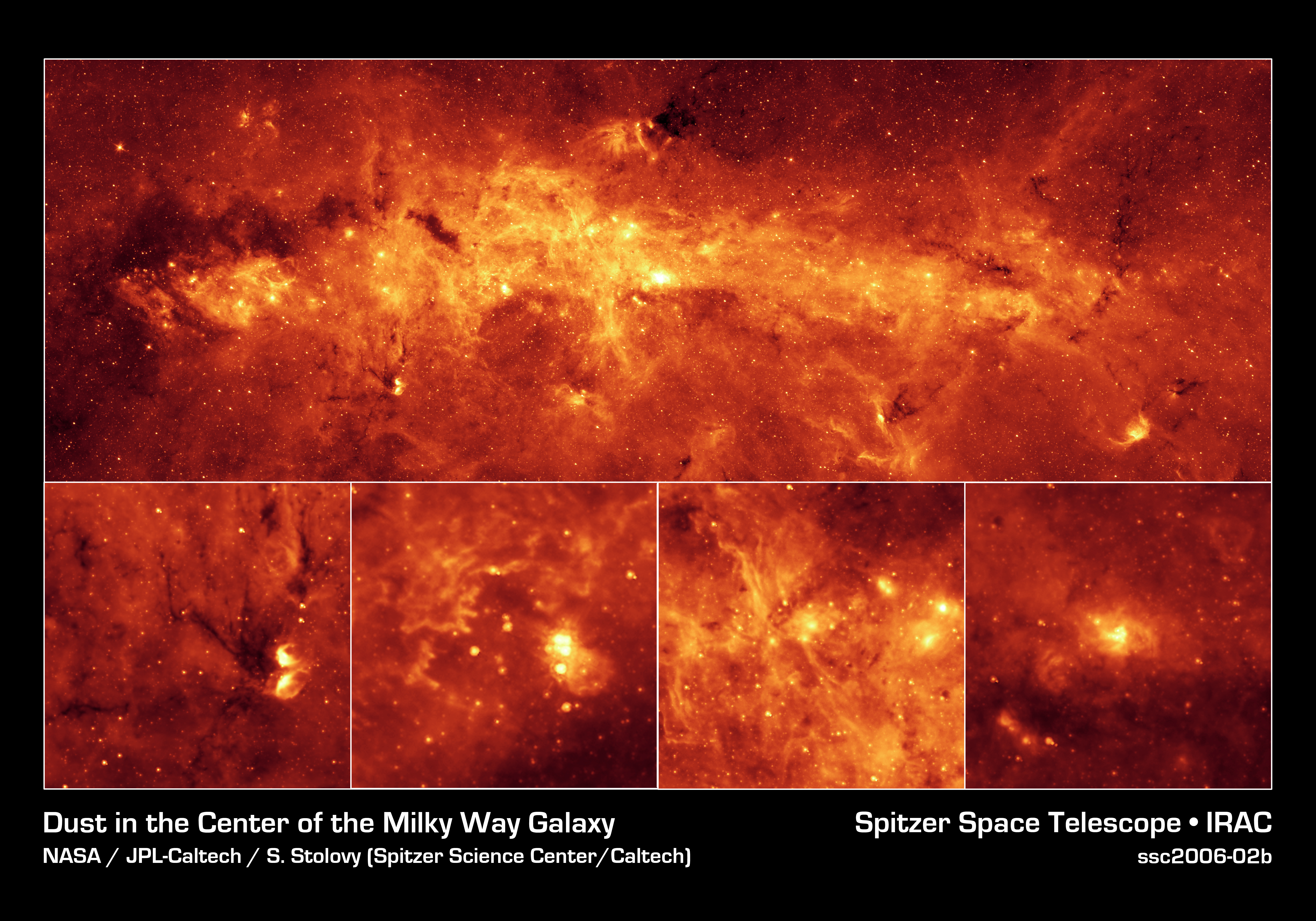
Mid-IR image of the center of the galaxy, with the Quintuplet stars as the brightest source to the left of the center (and 2nd inset)

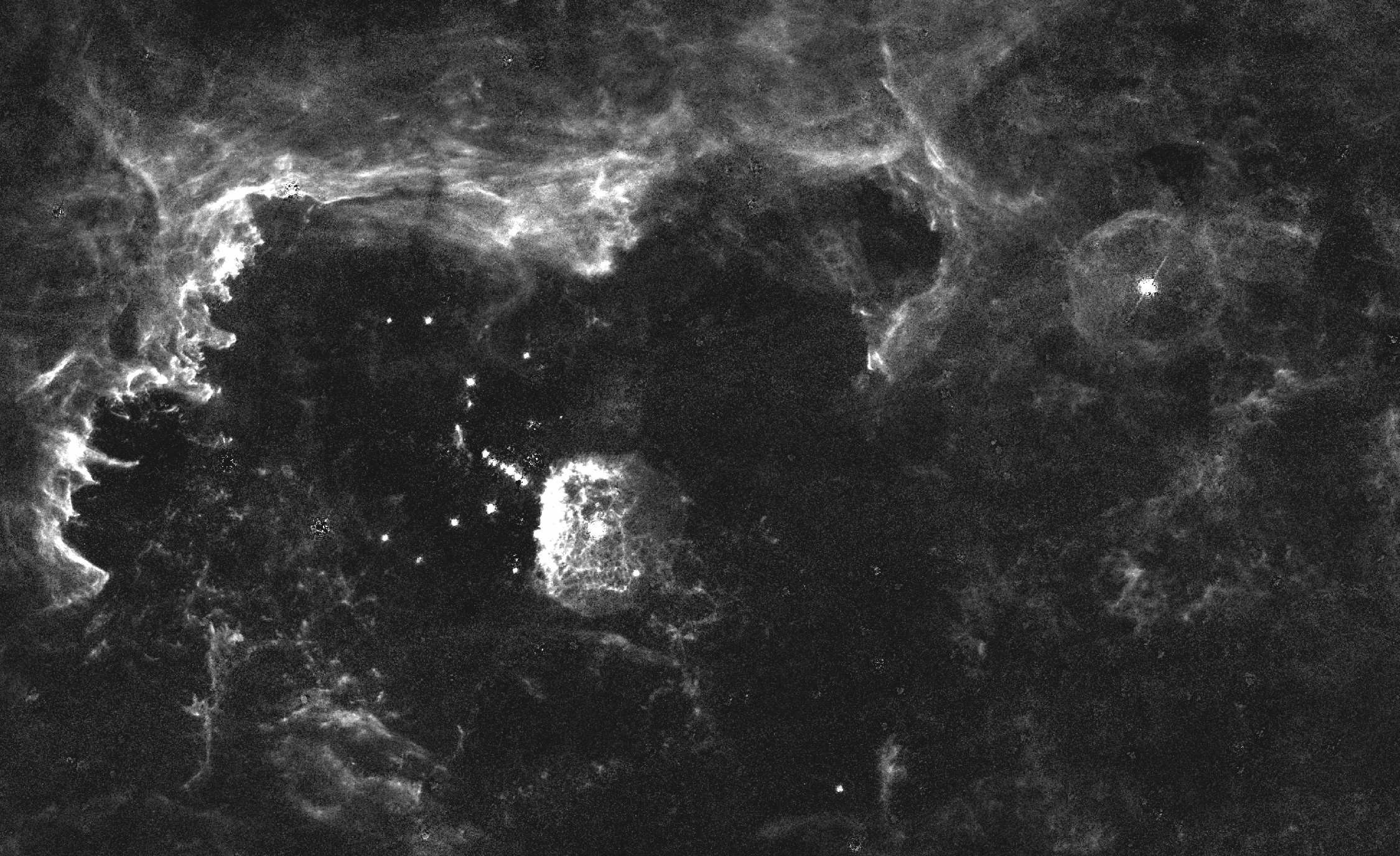
Image of the Quintuplet Cluster's brightest stars; V4998 Sagittarii, the Pistol Star, and qF362. The nebula on the left and upper portion of the image is the Sickle Nebula.

The Quintuplet is seen (in the infra-red) 12 arc-minutes NW of Sagittarius A* (Sgr A*). The cluster stars and associated objects such as the Pistol Nebula have large radial velocities only likely to be from orbiting close to the Galactic Center, so the cluster is thought to be physically associated with the galactic center. The Galactic Center is considered to be about 8 kpc away, so the projected distance of the Quintuplet on the sky is 30 pc from Sagittarius A*.

The age of the quintuplet can be estimated from the likely ages of its member stars. Mapping the stars of the cluster to evolutionary isochrones gives ages of around 4 million years. However stars such as the two (or three) LBVs are expected to explode as supernovae within three million years, an obvious problem. It has been suggested that the age may be as low as 3.3–3.6 million years, or that star formation was staggered over a million years or more. Another proposal is that the remaining highly massive stars were formed or rejuvenated by binary interactions.

The masses of stars clusters can be measured by integrating the stellar mass function. Although only the most massive cluster members can be detected, the mass function can be estimated to lower levels and the cluster mass is calculated to be around 10,000 M_{☉}.

== Sickle Nebula ==
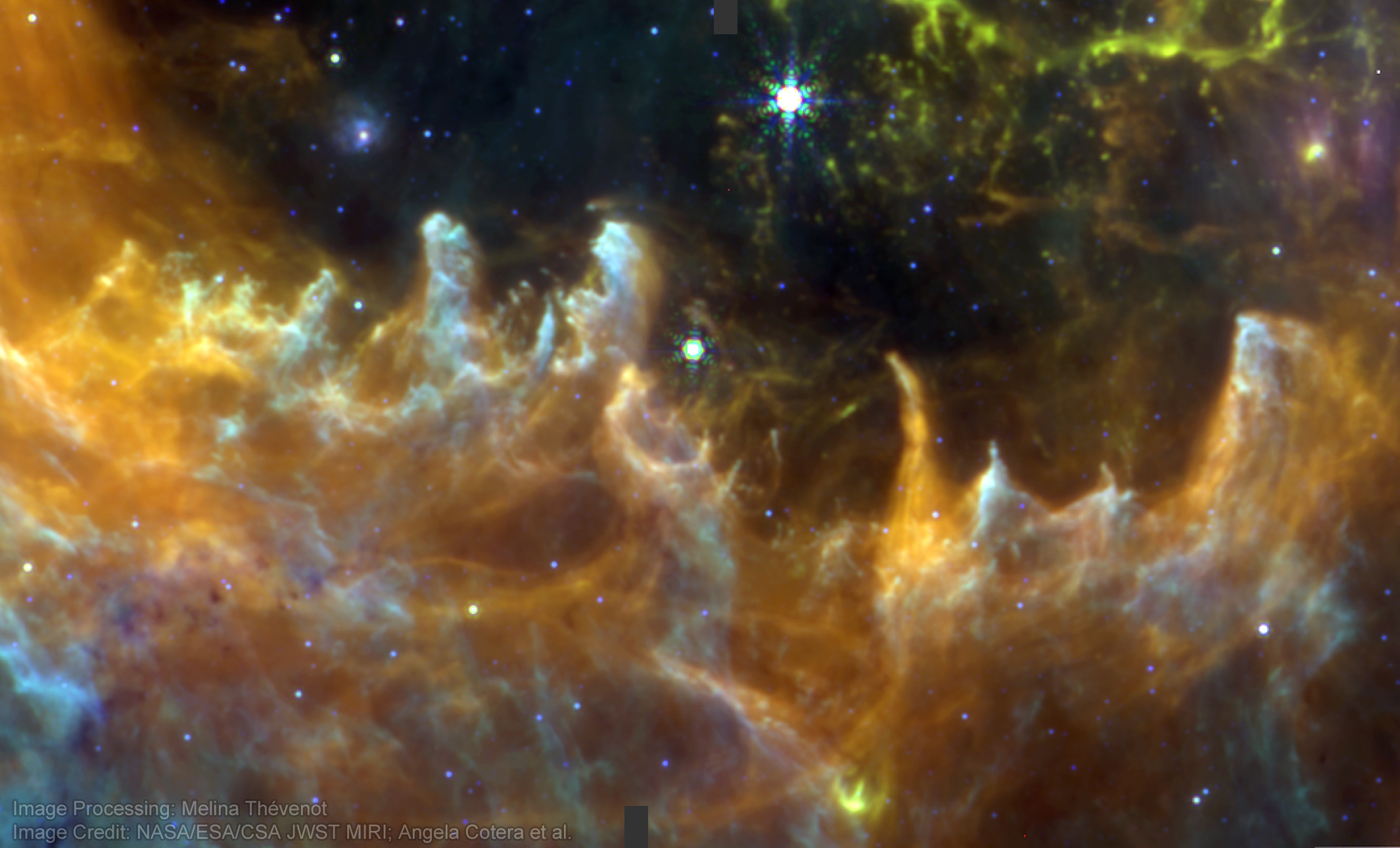
MIRI image of a part of the Sickle nebula

The nebula surrounding the Quintuplet is called G0.18-0.04, but is also called "the Sickle", due to its sickle-shaped appearance. The Quintuplet is the main ionizing source of this HII nebula. The sickle is detected in both radio and mid-infrared images. The nebula was imaged with Hubble, MeerKAT and later partly by JWST. The Wolf–Rayet star WR 102c is located inside the Sickle.

== Members ==
The Quintuplet contains a number of massive and somewhat evolved stars, including 21 Wolf–Rayet stars, 2 luminous blue variables (three including the nearby runaway V4998 Sagittarii), and a number of red supergiants. There is also associated nebulosity ionised by the hot stars, most notably the Pistol Nebula between the Pistol Star and the core of the Quintuplet.

Prominent stars (in K band infra-red)
| GCS | Q/GMM | LHO | qF/FMM | Other names | Spectral type | Magnitude (K_{S}) | Luminosity (L_{☉}) | Temperature (K) |
|---|---|---|---|---|---|---|---|---|
| 3-IV | 1 | 75 | 243 | WR 102da | WC9?d | 7.9 | ~150,000 | ~45,000 |
| 3-II | 2 | 42 | 231 | WR 102dc | WC9d + OB | 6.7 | ~150,000 | ~45,000 |
| 4 | 3 | 19 | 211 | WR 102ha | WC8/9d + OB | 7.2 | ~200,000 | ~50,000 |
| 3-I | 4 | 84 | 251 | WR 102dd | WC9d | 7.8 | ~150,000 | ~45,000 |
| | 5 | 115 | 270N | V4646 Sgr | M2 I | 8.6 (var?) | 24,000 | 3,600 |
| | 6 | 79 | 250 | | WC9d | 9.3 | ~150,000 | ~45,000 |
| | 7 | 7 | 192 | | M6 I | 7.6 | 47,000 | 3,274 |
| | 8 | 67 | 240 | WR 102hb | WN9h | 9.6 | 2,600,000 | 25,100 |
| 3-III | 9 | 102 | 258 | WR 102db | WC9?d | 9.2 | ~200,000 | ~45,000 |
| | 10 | 71 | 241 | WR 102ea | WN9h | 8.8 | 2,500,000 | 25,100 |
| | 11 | 47 | 235N | WR 102f | WC8 | 10.4 | ~200,000 | ~60,000 |
| | 12 | 77 | 278 | | O6–8 I eq? | 9.6 | ~1,200,000 | ~35,000 |
| | 13 | 100 | 257 | | O6–8 I fe | 9.4 | ~1,400,000 | ~35,000 |
| | 14 | 146 | 307A | | O6–8 I f? | 8.7 | ~2,500,000 | ~35,000 |
| | 15 | 110 | 270S | WR 102df | O6–8 I f (Of/WN?) | 10.6 | 1,600,000 | 25,100 |
| | | | 134 | Pistol Star | LBV | 7.3 | 3,300,000 | 11,800 |
| | | | 362 | V4650 Sgr | LBV | 7.1 | 1,800,000 | 11,300 |
| | | 99 | 256 | WR 102i | WN9h | 10.5 | 1,500,000 | 31,600 |
| | | 158 | 320 | WR 102d | WN9h | 10.5 | 1,200,000 | 35,100 |
| | | | | V4998 Sgr | LBV | 7.5 | 1,600,000–4,000,000 | 12,000 |
