= WR 102c =

Wolf-Rayet star

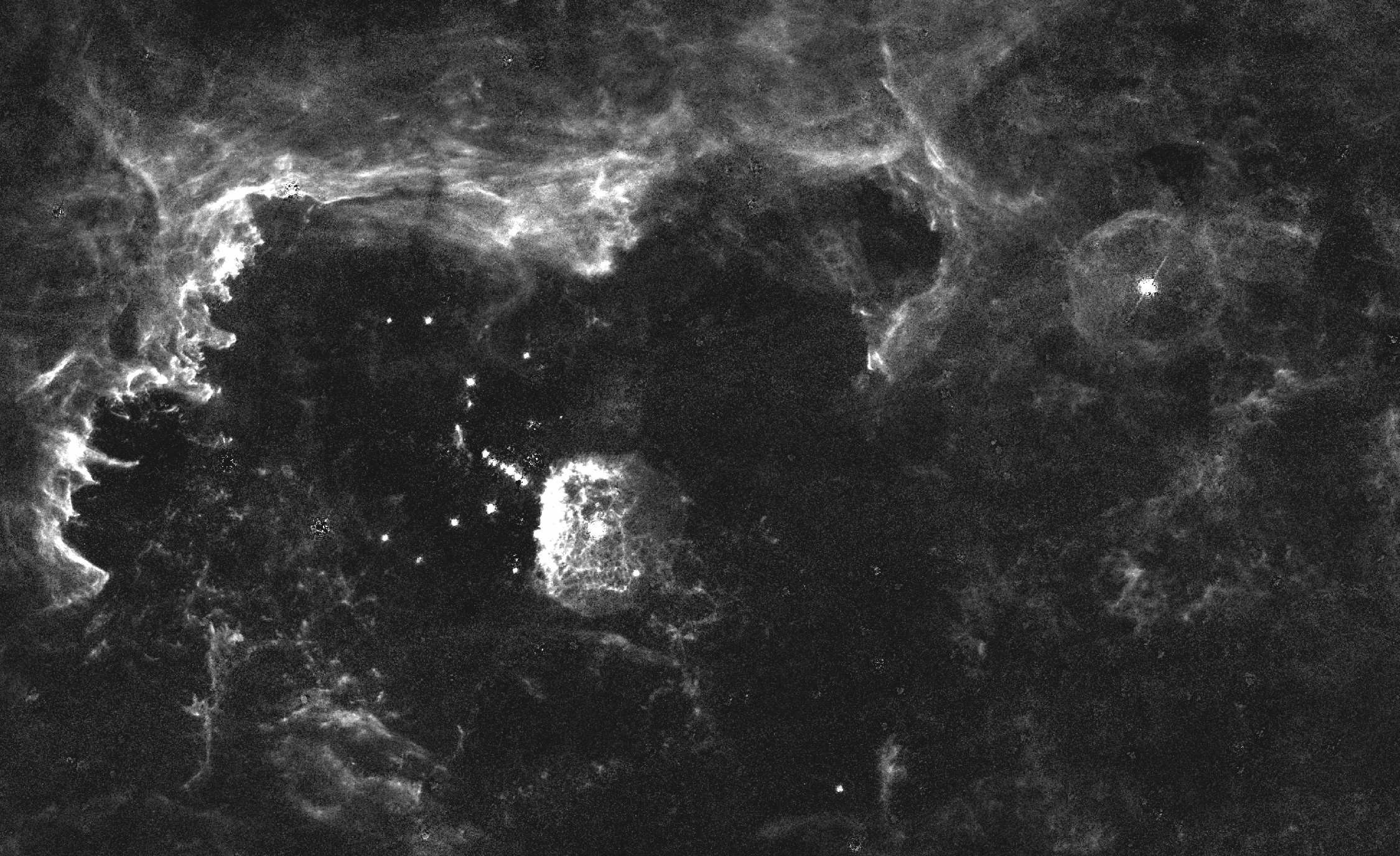
- Region around the Quintuplet Cluster. Full size image is annotated to show WR 102c. Credit: NASA/ESA, Hubble

Observation data Epoch J2000 Equinox ICRS
- Constellation: Sagittarius
- Right ascension: 17^{h} 46^{m} 11.14^{s}
- Declination: +28° 49′ 05.9″

Characteristics
- Evolutionary stage: Wolf–Rayet
- Spectral type: WN6
- Apparent magnitude (K): 11.6

Details
| Luminosity | 320,000-500,000 L_{☉} |
| Temperature | 65,000-75,000 K |
| Age | 4 - 6 Myr |

Other designations
- WR 102c, qF 353E

Database references
| SIMBAD | data |

WR 102c is a Wolf–Rayet star located in the constellation Sagittarius towards the galactic centre. It is only a few parsecs from the Quintuplet Cluster, within the Sickle Nebula.

== Features ==
According to recent estimations, WR 102c is as much as 500,000 times brighter than the Sun. An initial study reporting a much higher luminosity mistakenly used photometry from a nearby star. It would have formed as a 40 M_{☉} O-type main-sequence star a few million years ago and has since spent a period as a red supergiant before losing its outer layers completely. It is now almost hydrogen-free and nearing the end of its life. It will collapse within the next few hundred thousand years as it runs out of fuel in its core, producing a type Ib or Ic supernova or collapsing directly into a black hole.

WR 102c is surrounded by a shell of nebulosity which contains dust made even hotter than the star itself by intense radiation. The nebula also includes nearly 1 M_{☉} of molecular hydrogen and around 10 M_{☉} of ionised hydrogen, all expelled from the star.

There is a suggestion that WR 102c may be a binary star. A nearby corkscrew-shaped jet of nebulosity could have been expelled during the orbital motion. which would imply a period of 800 - 1,400 days. It is surrounded by a small cluster of stars around 1,000 M_{☉} in total, separate from the much more massive Quintuplet Cluster.
