= WR 102ea =

Star in the constellation Sagittarius

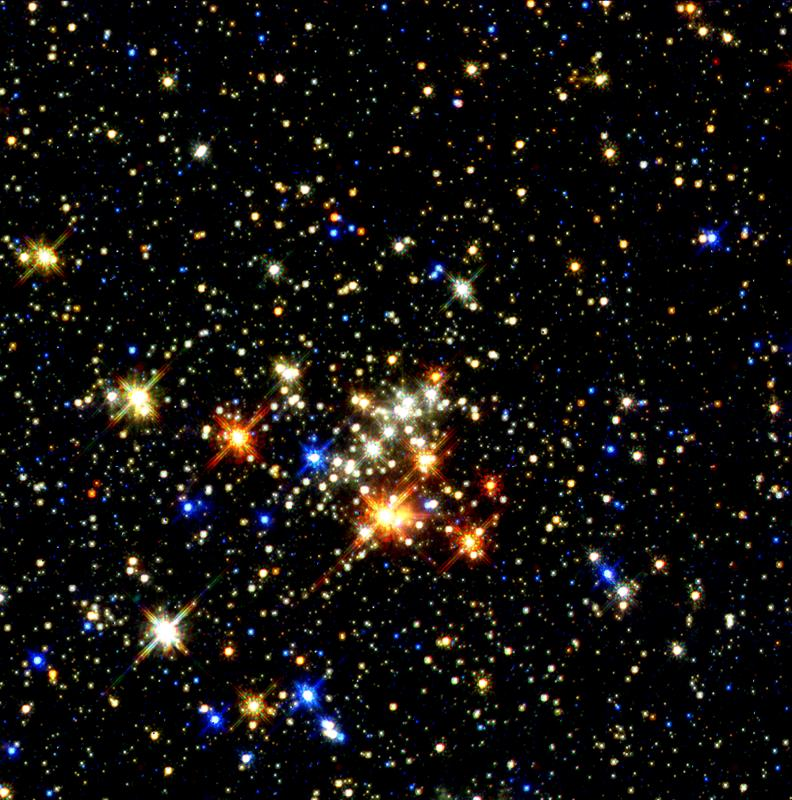
- WR 102ea (circled) in the Quintuplet Cluster

Observation data Epoch J2000 Equinox ICRS
- Constellation: Sagittarius
- Right ascension: 17^{h} 46^{m} 15.12^{s}
- Declination: −28° 49′ 36.9″

Characteristics
- Evolutionary stage: Wolf–Rayet
- Spectral type: WN9h
- Apparent magnitude (K): 8.8

Astrometry
Radial velocity (R_{v})	116 km/s
Proper motion (μ)	RA: -0.59 mas/yr Dec.: -1.21 mas/yr
Distance	26k ly (8k pc)

Details
Mass	58 M_{☉}
Radius	86 R_{☉}
Luminosity	2.5 million L_{☉}
Temperature	25,100 K
Age	~4 Myr

Other designations
- FMM 241, qF 241, (erroneously QPM-241), Q10, MGM 5-10, LHO 71

Database references
SIMBAD	data

WR 102ea is a Wolf–Rayet star in the constellation Sagittariius. It is the third most luminous star in the Quintuplet Cluster after WR 102hb. With a luminosity of 2,500,000 times solar, it is also one of the most luminous stars known. Despite the high luminosity it can only be observed at infra-red wavelengths due to the dimming effect of intervening dust on visual light.

It is an evolved massive star which has an emission line spectrum from a strong stellar wind caused by high luminosity and the presence of elements heavier than hydrogen in the photosphere. The spectrum is dominated by ionised helium and nitrogen lines due to convectional and rotational mixing of fusion products to the surface of the star. However it is still in a core hydrogen burning phase and hydrogen lines are also visible in the spectrum, in contrast to WN stars without hydrogen which are older, less massive, and less luminous. Despite being a relatively unevolved star, WR 102ea has lost over half its mass already.
