= Pistol Star =

Hypergiant star in Sagittarius

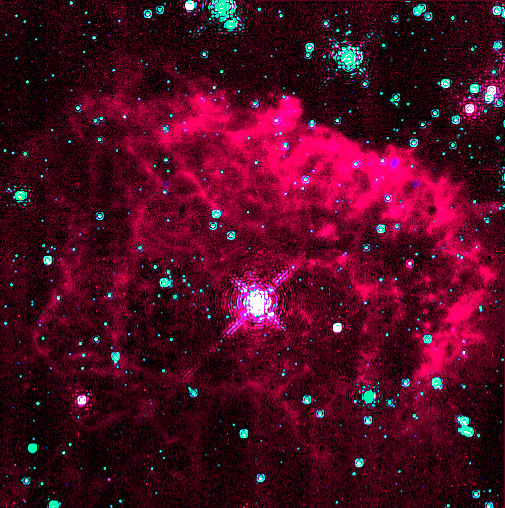
- False-color image of the Pistol Star and Pistol Nebula; Credit: HST NICMOS

Observation data Epoch J2000 Equinox ICRS
- Constellation: Sagittarius
- Right ascension: 17^{h} 46^{m} 15.3^{s}
- Declination: −28° 50′ 04″
- Apparent magnitude (V): >28

Characteristics
- Spectral type: LBV
- Apparent magnitude (J): 11.828
- Apparent magnitude (H): 8.920
- Apparent magnitude (K): 7.291
- Variable type: cLBV

Astrometry
Radial velocity (R_{v})	+130 km/s
Distance	7,700 pc

Details
Mass	27.5, 86.5, 92 M_{☉}
Radius	308 (Note: Calculated, using the Stefan-Boltzmann law and the star's effective temperature and luminosity, with respect to the solar nominal effective temperature of 5,772 K: $$\sqrt{\biggl(\frac{5,772}{11,800}\biggr)^4 \cdot 10^{6.22}} = 308\ R_\odot.$$) R_{☉}
Luminosity	1,660,000 L_{☉}
Temperature	11,800–12,000 K
Metallicity [Fe/H]	0.1 dex
Age	~4 Myr

Other designations
- V4647 Sgr, qF 134, 2MASS J17461524-2850035

Database references
SIMBAD	data

The Pistol Star (or V4647 Sagittarii) is an extremely luminous blue hypergiant star, one of the most luminous and massive known stars in the Milky Way. It is one of many massive young stars in the Quintuplet Cluster in the Galactic Center region. The star owes its name to the shape of the Pistol Nebula, which it illuminates. It is located approximately 25,000 light-years from Earth in the direction of Sagittarius. The star is massive, estimated to be either 27.5 or roughly 90 times as massive as the Sun (M_{☉}), and luminous, with a luminosity 1.7 million times that of the Sun (L_{☉}). It would be visible to the naked eye as a 4th-magnitude star if it were not for the interstellar dust near the Galactic Center of the Milky Way that absorbs almost all of its visible light. The name Pistol Star was officially added to the IAU Catalog of Star Names on 22 March 2026.

== Properties ==
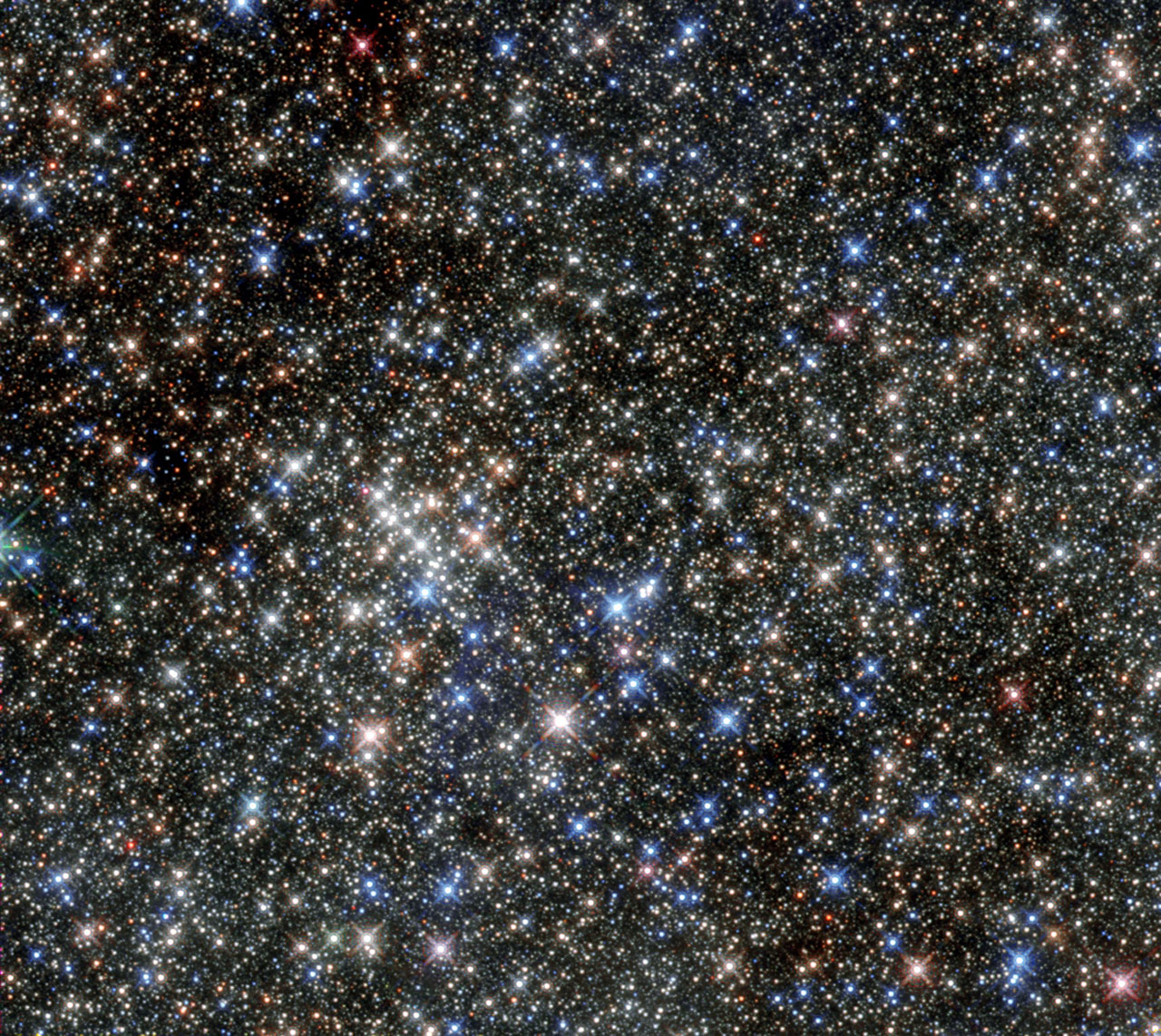
The Pistol Star is the brightest star in this image of the Quintuplet Cluster, just below centre.

The Pistol Star was discovered using the Hubble Space Telescope in the early 1990s by Don Figer, an astronomer at UCLA. The star is thought to have ejected almost 10 solar masses of material in giant outbursts perhaps 4,000 to 6,000 years ago (as observed from Earth). Its stellar wind is over 10 billion times stronger than the Sun's. Its exact age and future are not known, but it is expected to end in a brilliant supernova or pair-instability supernova in 1 to 3 million years. The mass is equally uncertain, thought to have been up to 200 times the Sun when initially formed but now considerably less due to extreme mass loss. Modelling the star itself to match its spectrum gives a mass of 27.5 M_{☉}, while matching its current properties to an evolutionary model gives a much higher mass (86.5 or 92 M_{☉}). Earlier studies once claimed the Pistol Star as the most massive star known at around 250 M_{☉}.

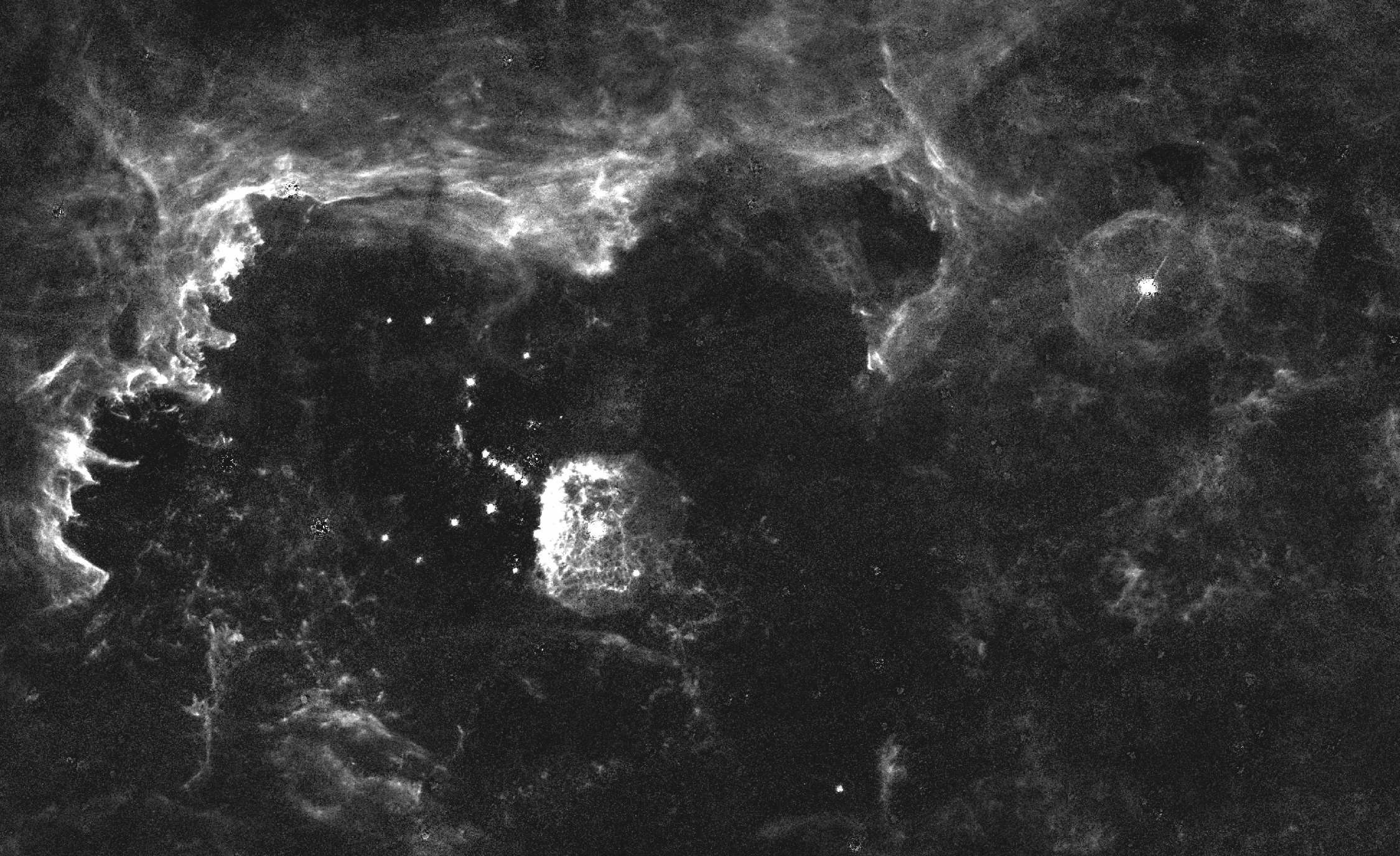
Quintuplet Cluster region, centered on the Pistol Star and its surrounding nebula

Later studies have reduced its estimated luminosity making it a candidate luminous blue variable about 1.6 million L_{☉} (one third as luminous as the binary star system Eta Carinae), hence a radius of 306 R_{☉} based on an effective temperature around 12,000 K, or as high as 3.3 million L_{☉}, hence a correspondingly larger radius of 420 R_{☉}. (Note: Applying the Stefan–Boltzmann law with a nominal solar effective temperature of 5,772 K: $$\sqrt{(5772/12,000)^4 \cdot 3,300,000} = 420\ R_\odot$$.) One 2026 publication determined its luminosity to be 1,660,000 L_{☉}, which together with an effective temperature of 11,800 K, implies a radius around 308 R_{☉}. Assuming the larger radius, if the Pistol Star were placed in the center of the Solar System, its surface would lie beyond the orbit of Mars. It radiates about as much energy in 20 seconds as the Sun does in a year.

A close point source has been discovered hidden in the surrounding nebulosity, but there has been no confirmation of this being a star or whether it is physically associated.

== See also ==
- LBV 1806−20
- WHL0137-LS
- List of largest stars
- Wolf–Rayet star
