= Pistol Nebula =

Nebula around the Pistol Star

Emission nebula
- H II region
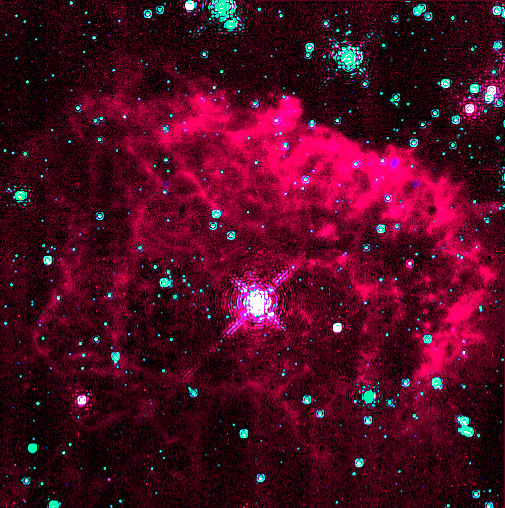
- False-color image of the Pistol Star and Pistol Nebula, taken by NICMOS

Observation data: epoch
- Right ascension: 17^{h} 46^{m} 15.3^{s}
- Declination: −28° 50′ 04″
- Distance: 25,000 ly
- Constellation: Sagittarius

Physical characteristics
- Radius: 2.114 ly

The Pistol Nebula is located in the constellation Sagittarius. It surrounds one of the most luminous stars known, the Pistol Star. Both are located 25,000 light years away from Earth in the Quintuplet Cluster, near the center of the Milky Way galaxy. The nebula contains approximately 9.3 solar masses worth of ionized gas that was ejected by the star several thousand years ago.

The nebula was first observed in radio light by the Very Large Array in the early 1980s. It was named for its shape as seen in low resolution images that were available at the time.

The Pistol Star, a luminous blue variable is 1.6 million times brighter than the Sun making it one of the most luminous stars in the Milky Way.

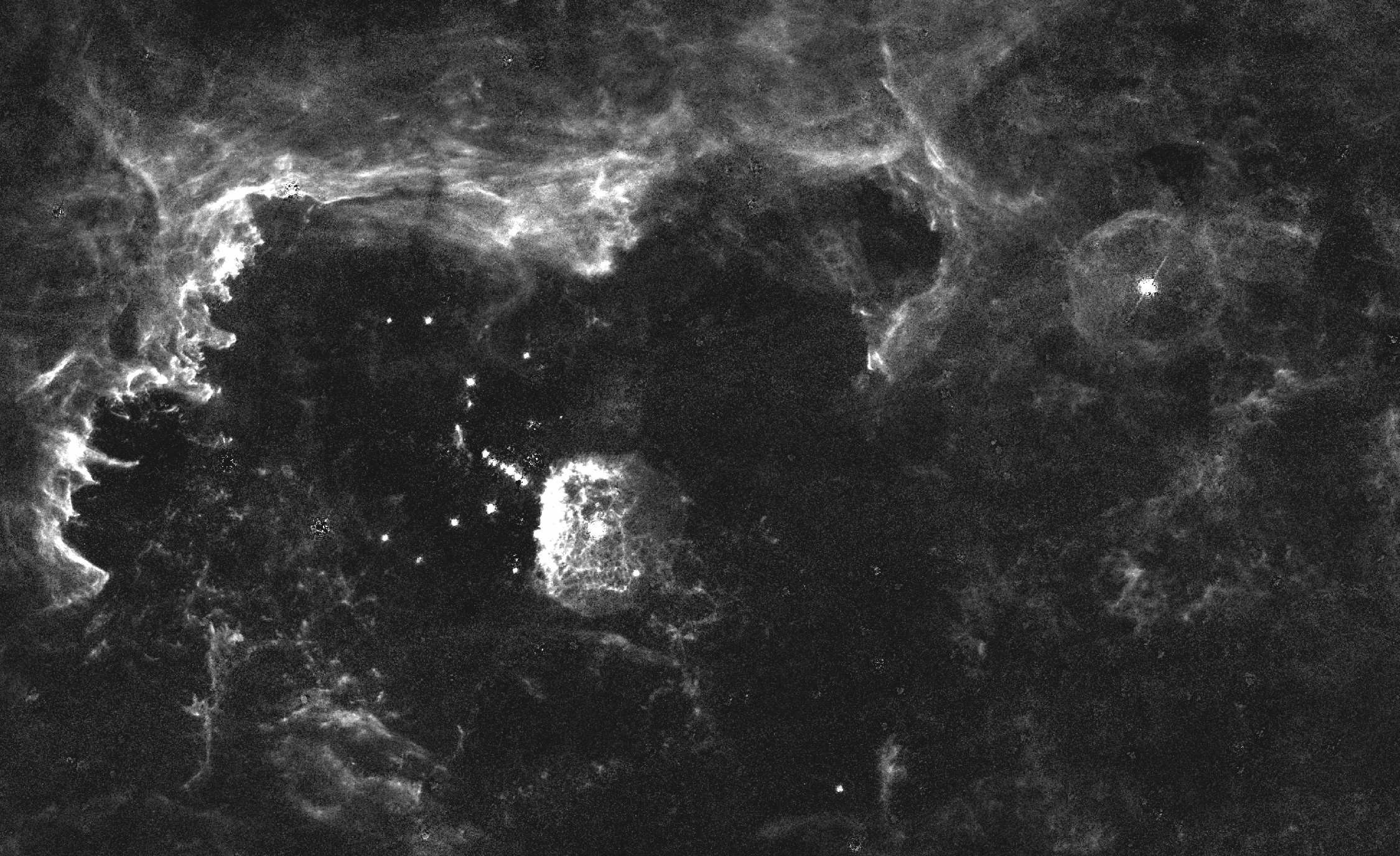
Quintuplet Cluster region with the Pistol Nebula at center
