= Shuji Sato (astronomer) =

Japanese astronomer (born 1945)

佐藤修二 Shuji Sato
- Born: 9 April 1945 (age 81); Japan Fukuoka Prefecture
- Education: Kyoto University
- Scientific career
- Fields: Infrared astronomy
- Workplaces: Kyoto University; University of Tokyo; National Astronomical Observatory of Japan; Nagoya University

Shuji Sato (佐藤 修二, SATO Shuji; born 9 April 1945, in Fukuoka Prefecture, Japan) is a Japanese astronomer and Professor Emeritus of Nagoya University. His specialty is infrared astronomy.

== Career ==
1968 graduated from the Department of Physics, Faculty of Science, Kyoto University.
1973 received a PhD degree from the Department of Physics, Graduate School of Science, Kyoto University.
1973 became an assistant professor at the Department of Physics, Graduate School of Science, Kyoto University.
1987 became an associate professor at the Tokyo Astronomical Observatory, University of Tokyo (present National Astronomical Observatory of Japan).
1988 became an associate professor at the National Astronomical Observatory of Japan.
1992 became a professor at the Graduate School of Science, Nagoya University.
2008 retired from Nagoya University and kept the Laboratory as a donated Professor.

His graduate school supervisor was Haruyuki Okuda. One of his students is Motohide Tamura.

== Professional record ==
1970 constructed Astronomical Infra Red Observatory (AIRO) at Agematsu, Kiso, Nagano, and various infrared photometers and started the infrared observations in Japan.
1980 developed the observations using the instruments overseas, Mauna Kea, Australia, and Mainland, USA and carried out the researches.
1987 arranged the infrastructure to develop the SUBARU Project in Hawaii.
1992 built up TRISPEC (Triple-Range Imager and SPECtrograph with Polarimetry) and carried out the researches at Mauna Kea in 2001~02 and Okayama in 2003.
1998 constructed Infra-Red Survey Facility (IRSF with SIRIUS; Simultaneous InfraRed Imager for Unbiased Survey) at Sutherland, South Africa, and carried out a number of survey works.
2004 constructed the KANATA telescope at Higashi-Hiroshima, with which he carried out the researches using TRISPEC in collaboration with Hiroshima University.
2008 devised a compact and inexpensive instrument, TRIPOL (Triple-Range Imager with Polarimetry) and distributed them in East Asia, with which he is continuing researches.
