= Near Infrared Camera and Multi-Object Spectrometer =

Instrument on HST

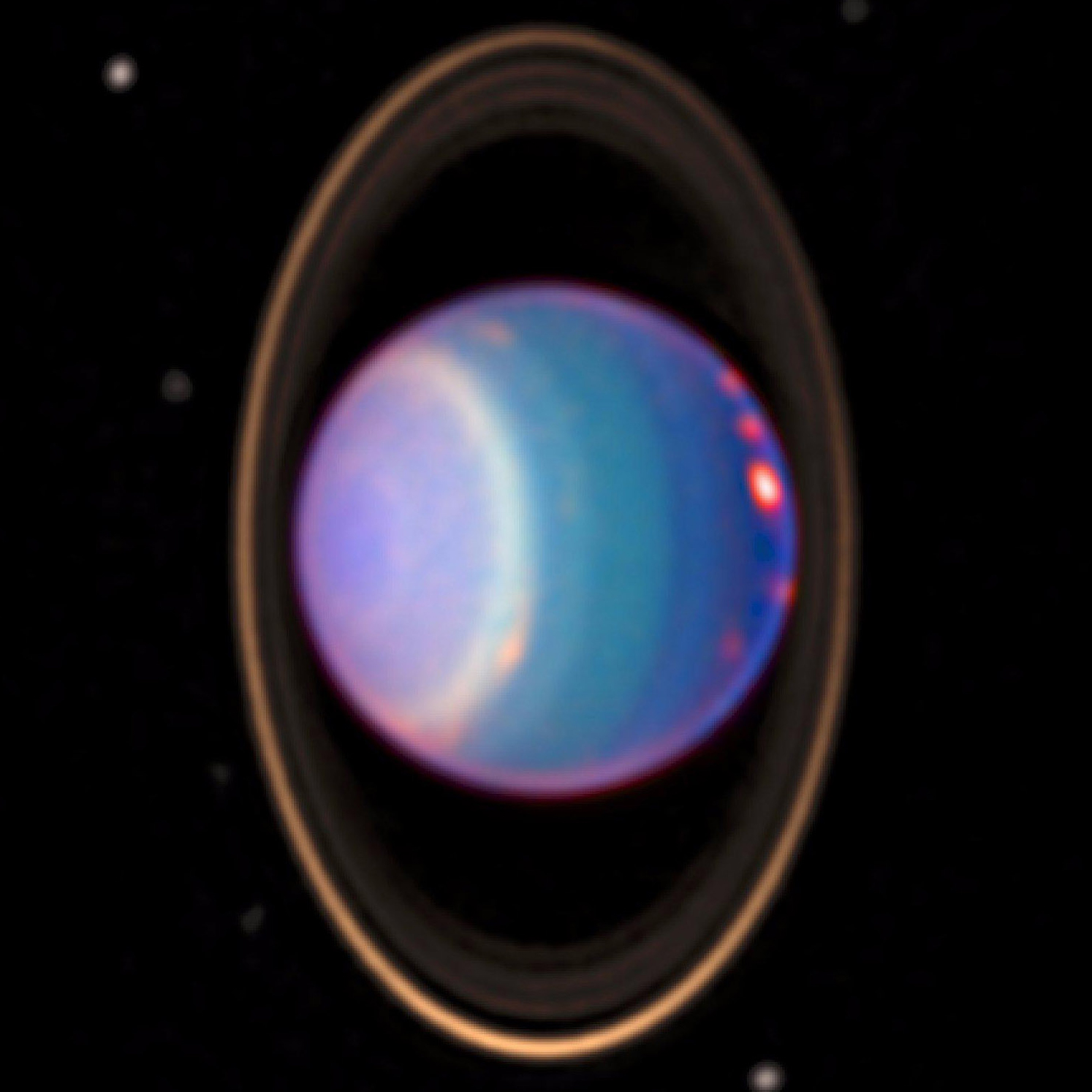
The gas giant Uranus showing cloud bands, rings, and moons of the Uranian system, taken with NICMOS in 1998

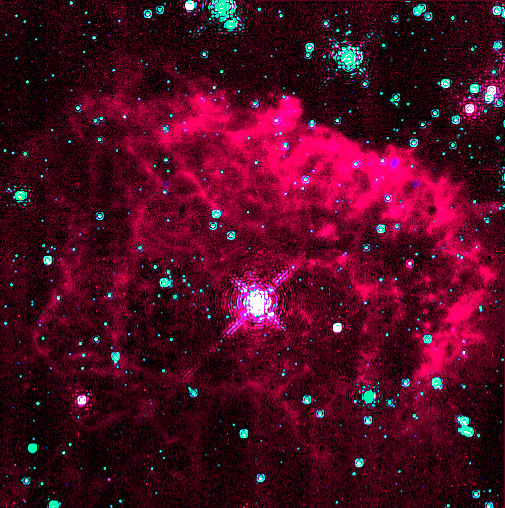
Pistol Star and Pistol Nebula, taken by NICMOS in 1997

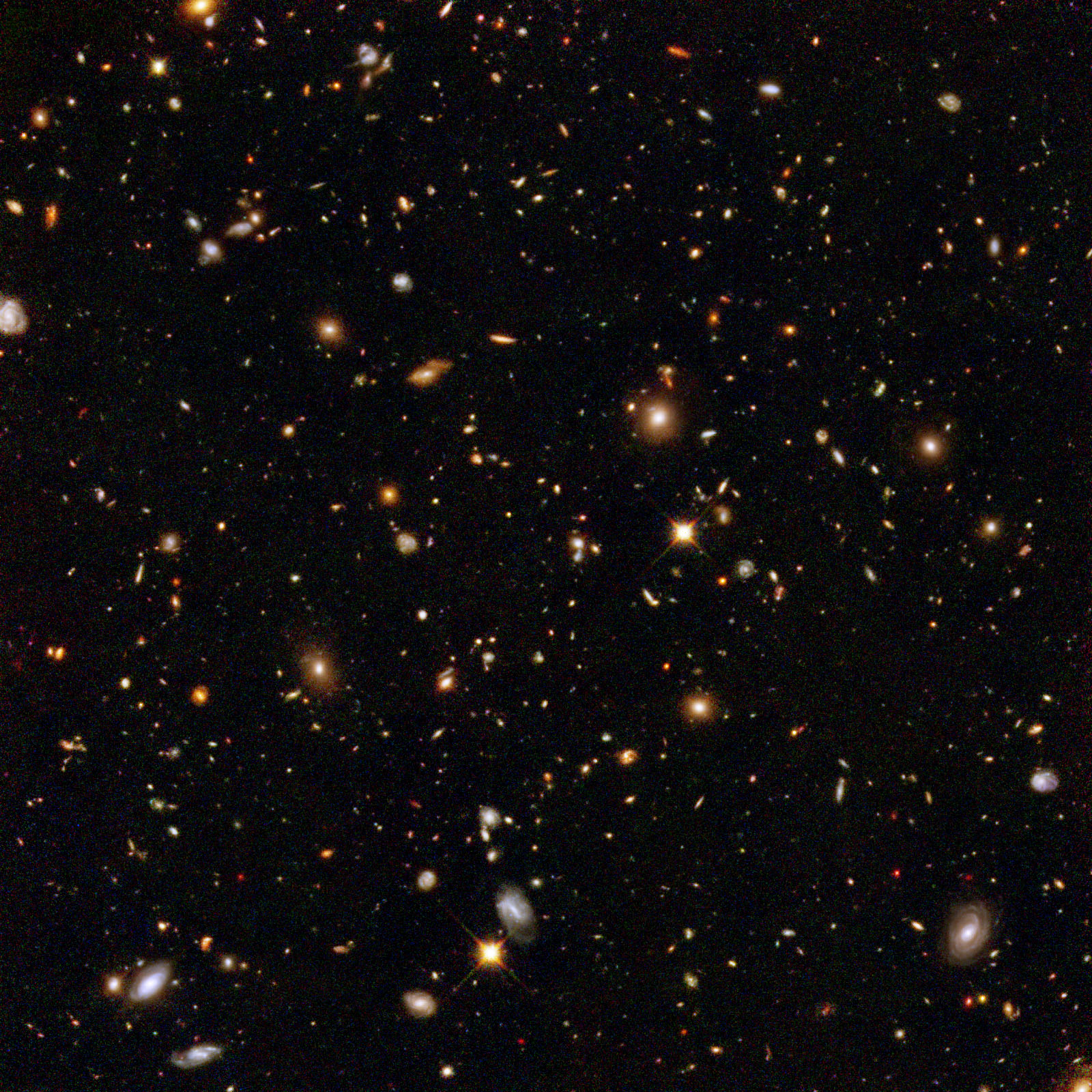
NICMOS's Hubble Ultra Deep Field. The instrument provided near-infrared views of the HUDF, extending the data available for that area.

The Near Infrared Camera and Multi-Object Spectrometer (NICMOS) is a scientific instrument for infrared astronomy, installed on the Hubble Space Telescope (HST), operating from 1997 to 1999, and from 2002 to 2008. Images produced by NICMOS contain data from the near-infrared part of the light spectrum.

NICMOS was conceived and designed by the NICMOS Instrument Definition Team centered at Steward Observatory, University of Arizona, USA. NICMOS is an imager and multi-object spectrometer built by Ball Aerospace & Technologies Corp. that allows the HST to observe infrared light, with wavelengths between 0.8 and 2.4 micrometers, providing imaging and slitless spectrophotometric capabilities. NICMOS contains three near-infrared detectors in three optical channels providing high (~ 0.1 arcsecond) resolution, coronagraphic and polarimetric imaging, and slitless spectroscopy in 11-, 19-, and 52-arcsecond square fields of view. Each optical channel contains a 256×256 pixel photodiode array of mercury cadmium telluride infrared detectors bonded to a sapphire substrate, read out in four independent 128×128 quadrants.

NICMOS last worked in 2008, and has been largely replaced by the infrared channel of Wide Field Camera 3 after its installation in 2009.

== Limitations ==
The infrared performance of the Hubble has limitations since it was not designed with infrared performance as an objective. For example, the mirror is kept at a stable and relatively high temperature (15 °C) by heaters.

HST is a warm telescope. The IR background flux collected by cooled focal plane IR instruments like NICMOS or WFC3 is dominated, at rather short wavelengths, by telescope thermal emission rather than by zodiacal scattering. NICMOS data show that the telescope background exceeds the zodiacal background at wavelengths longer than λ ≈ 1.6μm, the exact value depending on the pointing on the sky and on the position of the Earth on its orbit.

Despite this, the combination of Hubble's mirror and NICMOS offered never-before seen levels of quality in near-infrared performance at that time. Dedicated infrared telescopes like the Infrared Space Observatory were ground-breaking in their own way, but had a smaller primary mirror, and were also out of service at the time of NICMOS installation because they ran out of coolant. NICMOS later overcame this problem by using a machine chiller like a refrigerator, which allowed it operate for years until it went offline in 2008.

== History of NICMOS ==
NICMOS was installed on Hubble during its second servicing mission in 1997 (STS-82) along with the Space Telescope Imaging Spectrograph, replacing two earlier instruments. NICMOS in turn has been largely superseded by the Wide Field Camera 3, which has a much larger field of view (135 by 127 arcsec, or 2.3 by 2.1 arcminutes), and reaches almost as far into the infrared.

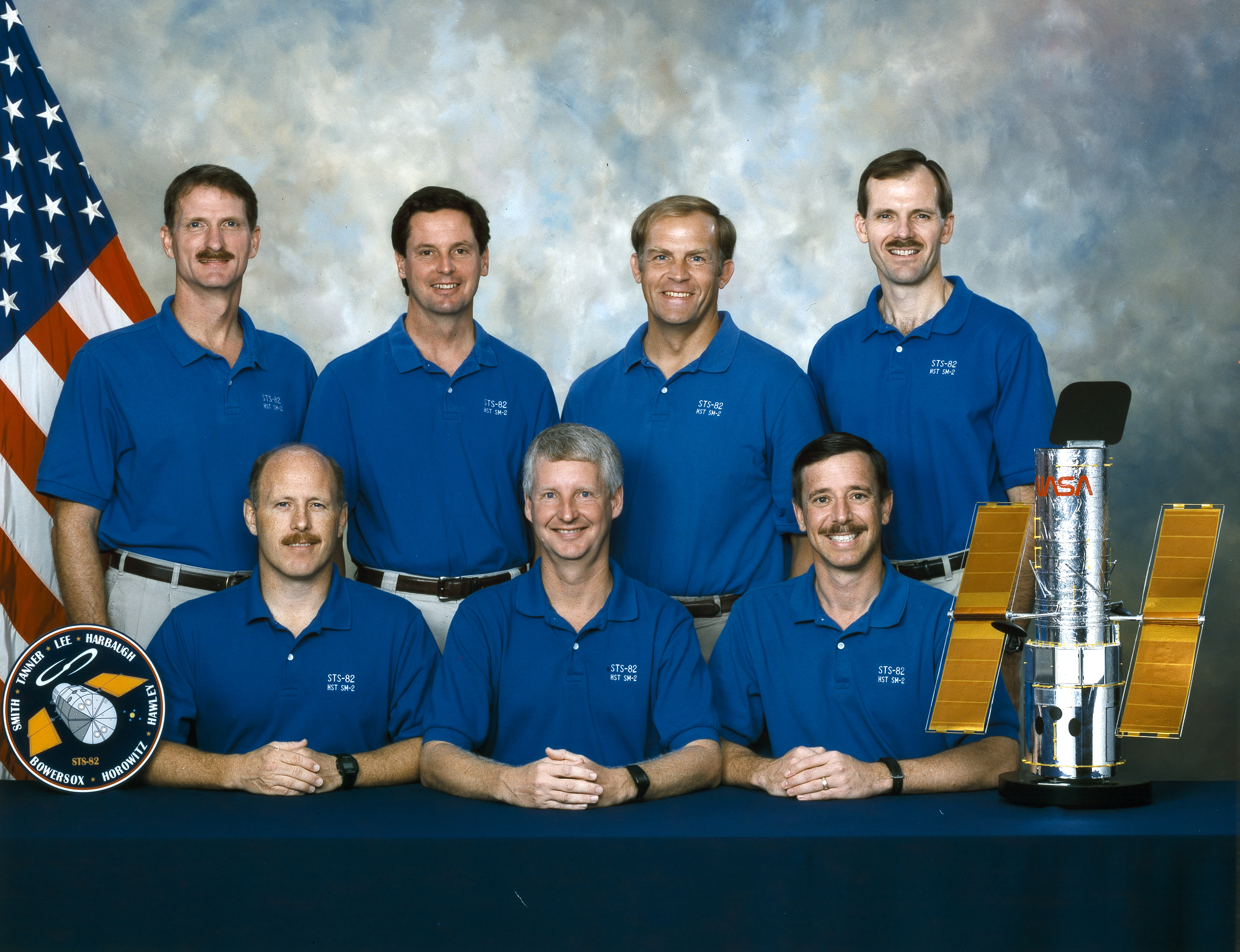
NICMOS was installed by the crew of STS-82, this Space Shuttle mission in 1997 also installed the STIS instrument on Hubble Space Telescope, a scale model of the telescope is shown with this crew photo

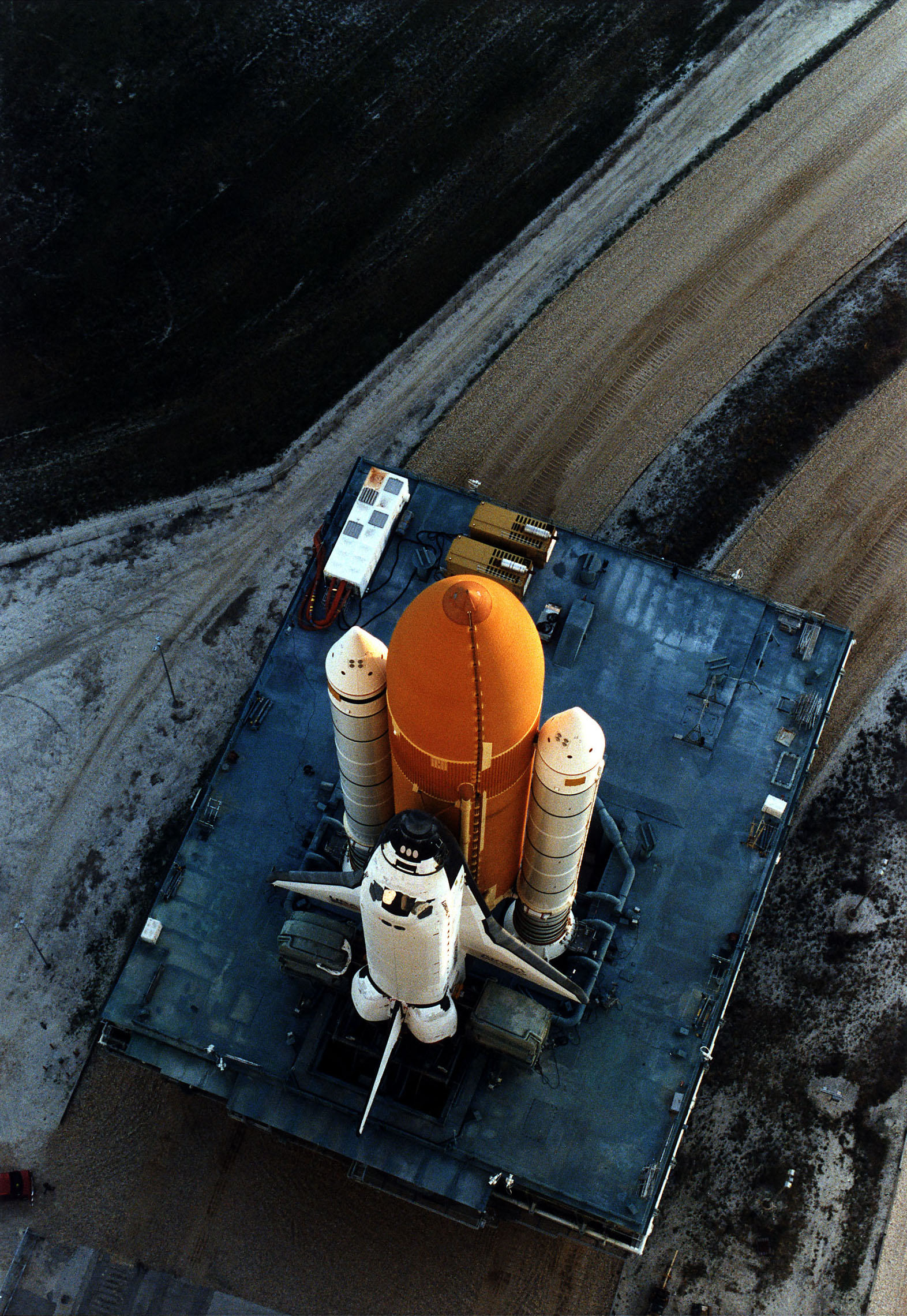
NICMOS's ride to space heads to the launchpad, January 1997

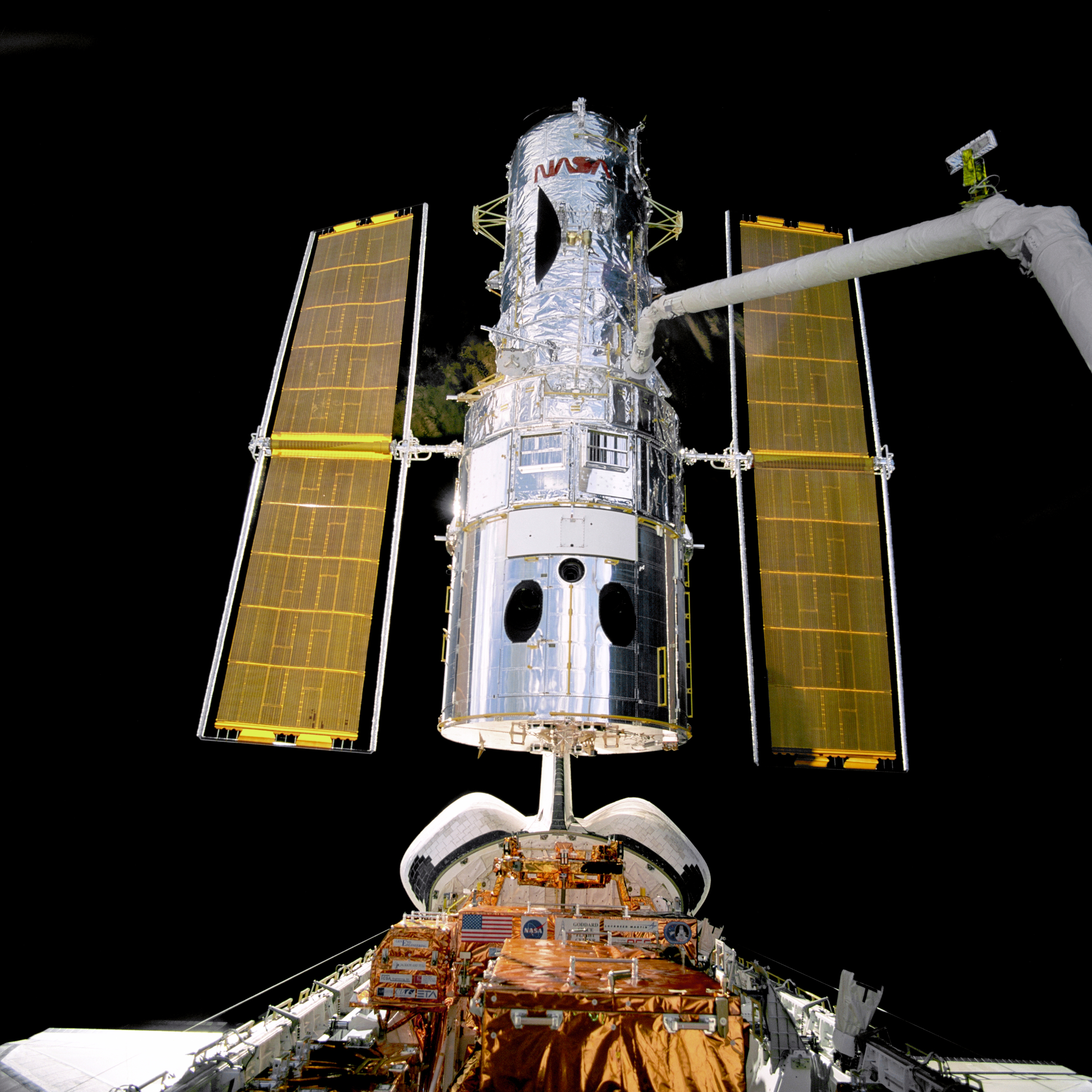
Hubble Space Telescope held by the Space Shuttle robotic arm

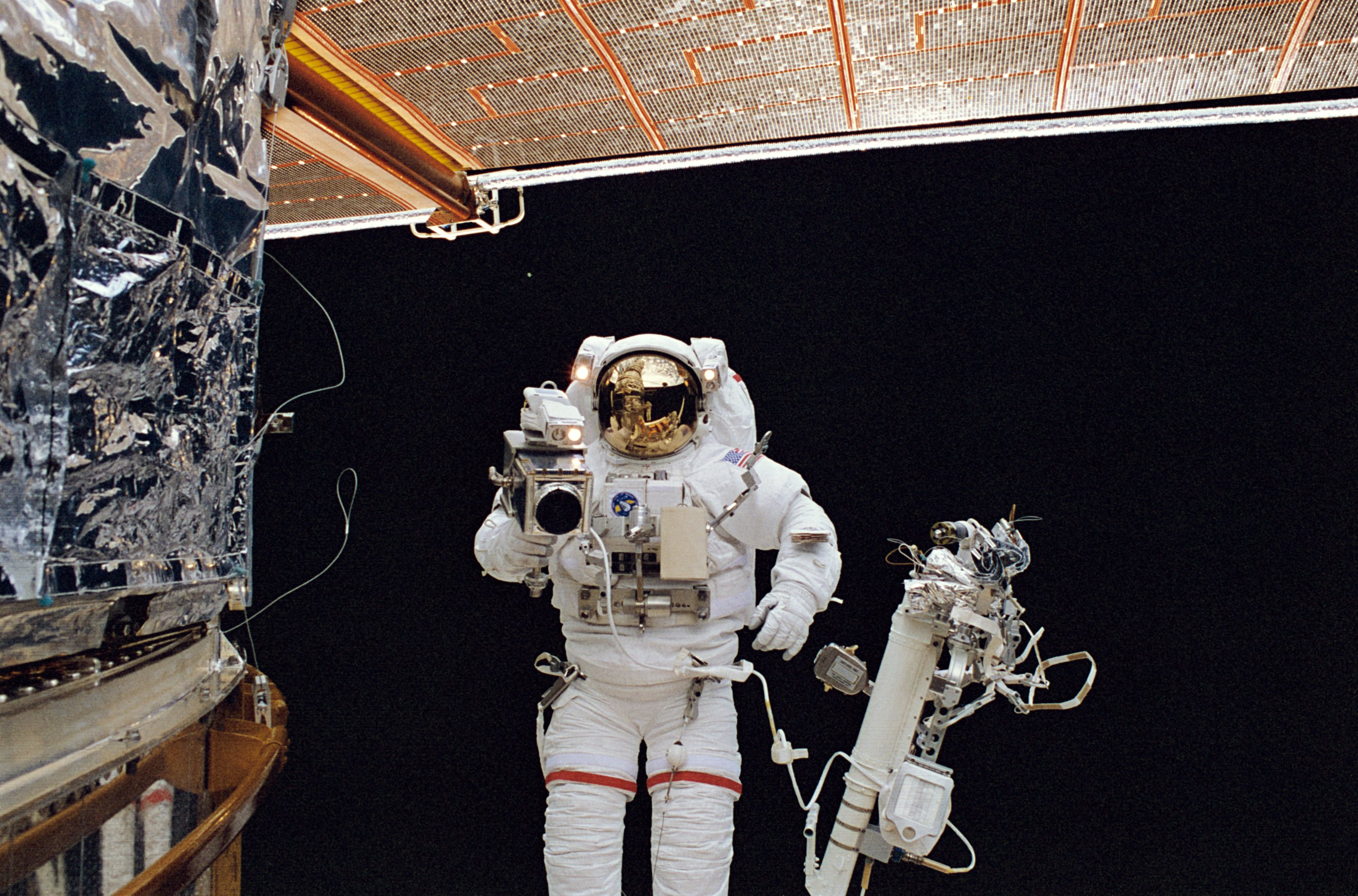
Shuttle crew EVA with Hubble Space Telescope

When conducting infrared measurements, it is necessary to keep the infrared detectors cooled to avoid having infrared interference from the instrument's own thermal emissions. NICMOS contains a cryogenic dewar, that cooled its detectors to about 61 K, and optical filters to ~ 105 K, with a block of solid nitrogen ice. When NICMOS was installed in 1997, the dewar flask contained a 230-pound (104 kg) block of nitrogen ice. Due to a thermal short that arose on March 4, 1997, during the instrument commissioning, the dewar ran out of nitrogen coolant sooner than expected in January 1999.

During Hubble Service Mission 3B in 2002 (STS-109), a replacement cooling system comprising a cryocooler, cryogenic circulator, and external radiator was installed on the Hubble that now cools NICMOS through a cryogenic neon loop. The NICMOS Cooling System (NCS) was developed on a very accelerated schedule (14 months vs. 5–10 years for other Hubble instrument hardware). NICMOS was returned to service soon after SM 3B.

A new software upload in September 2008 necessitated a brief shutdown of the NICMOS cooling system. Several attempts to restart the cooling system were unsuccessful due to issues with the cryogenic circulator. After waiting more than six weeks for parts of the instrument to warm up, and theorized ice particles to sublimate from the neon circulating loop, the cooler once again failed to restart. An Anomaly Review Board (ARB) was then convened by NASA. The ARB concluded that ice or other solid particle migrated from the dewar to the circulator during the September 2008 restart attempt and that the circulator may be damaged, and determined an alternative set of startup parameters. A successful restart at 13:30 EST on 16 December 2008 led to four days of cooler operations followed by another shutdown. On 1 August 2009, the cooler was restarted again; NICMOS was expected to resume operations in mid-February 2010 and operated through October 22, 2009, at which point a lock-up of Hubble's data handling system caused the telescope to shut down. The circulation flow rate to NICMOS was greatly reduced during this operating period confirming blockage in the circulation loop. Continued operation at reduced flow rates would limit NICMOS science so plans for purging and refilling the circulation system with clean neon gas were developed by NASA. The circulation loop is equipped with an extra neon tank and remotely operated solenoid valves for on-orbit purge-fill operations. As of 2013, these purge-fill operations have not yet been performed.

WFC3, installed 2009, was designed to partly replace NICMOS.

On June 18, 2010, it was announced NICMOS would not be available for science during the latest proposal Cycle 18. As of 2013, a decision as to whether the purge-fill operations will be performed and whether NICMOS will be available for science in the future has not been made.

NICMOS is also the name of the device's 256×256-pixel imaging sensor built by Rockwell International Electro-Optical Center (now DRS Technologies).

== Scientific results ==
NICMOS was noted for its performance in Near-infrared space astronomy, in particular its ability to see objects through dust. It was used for about 23 months after it was installed, its life limited by set amount of cryo-coolant, and then later it was used for several years when a new cryo-cooler was installed in 2002. NICMOS combined near infrared performance with a large mirror.

NICMOS allowed investigation of high redshift galaxies and quasars with high spatial resolution, which was especially useful when analyzed in conjunction with other instruments such as the STIS, and it also allowed deeper investigation of stellar populations. In planetary science, NICMOS was used to discover an impact basin on the south pole of the asteroid 4 Vesta. (4 Vesta was later visited by Dawn (spacecraft) in the 2010s which investigated it more closely by orbiting it.)

In 2009, an old NICMOS image was processed to show a predicted exoplanet around the star HR 8799. The system is thought to be about 130 light-years from Earth.

In 2011, around that same star, four exoplanets were rendered viewable in a NICMOS image taken in 1998, using advanced data processing. The exoplanets were originally discovered with the Keck telescopes and the Gemini North telescope between 2007 and 2010. The image allows the orbits of the exoplanets to be analyzed more closely, since they take many decades, even hundreds of Earth years, to orbit their host star.

NICMOS observed the exoplanet XO-2b at star XO-2, and a spectroscopy result was obtained for this exoplanet in 2012. This uses the spectroscopic abilities of the instrument, and in astronomy spectroscopy during a planetary transit (an exoplanet passes in front of star from the perspective of Earth) is a way to study that exoplanet's possible atmosphere.

In 2014, researchers recovered planetary discs in old NICMOS data using new image processing techniques.

== Shuttle missions ==
- STS-82, (year:1997) installed, NICMOS replaces GHRS
- STS-109, (year:2002) new crycooler installed, returned to operation.

== See also ==
- James Webb Space Telescope (dedicated near-infrared telescope)
- List of largest infrared telescopes
- NICMOSlook
- Herschel Space Telescope (deep infrared space telescope 2009–2013)
- Infrared Array Camera (Spitzer near to mid infrared camera)
