= AFGL 2298 =

Star in the constellation Aquila

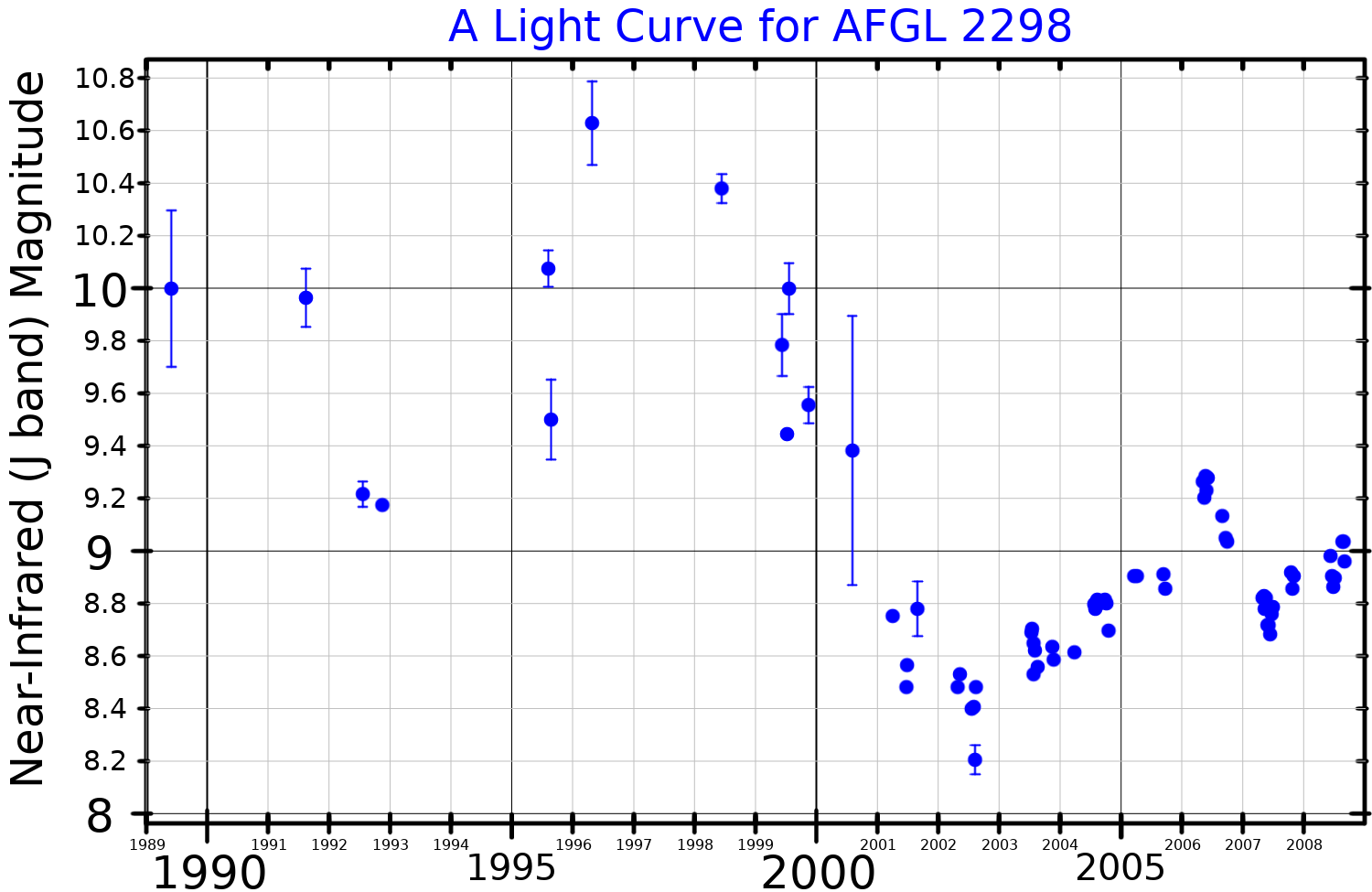
- A near-infrared (J band) light curve for AFGL 2298, adapted from Clark et al. (2009)

Observation data Epoch J2000 Equinox ICRS
- Constellation: Aquila
- Right ascension: 19^{h} 00^{m} 10.89^{s}
- Declination: +03° 45′ 47.1″

Characteristics
- Spectral type: B8I, B:I:[e], B0-0.5I
- Apparent magnitude (J): 12.164
- Apparent magnitude (H): 8.918
- Apparent magnitude (K): 6.91
- Variable type: LBV

Astrometry
| Distance | 30,000±10,000 ly (10,000±3,000 pc) |
| Absolute bolometric magnitude (M_{bol}) | −11.25 |

Details
| Radius | 158 - 385 R_{☉} |
| Luminosity | 1,300,000 - 2,000,000 L_{☉} |
| Temperature | 11,000 - 15,500 or 26,000 K |

Other designations
- V1672 Aql, RAFGL 2298, IRAS 18576+0341, 2MASS J19001089+0345471

Database references
| SIMBAD | data |

AFGL 2298, also known as IRAS 18576+0341, is a luminous blue variable star (LBV) located in the constellation Aquila, very close to the galactic plane. Its distance is not well known; it may be anywhere between 23,000 and 42,000 light years (7,000 to 13,000 parsecs) away from the Earth. Despite being extremely luminous, it is extremely reddened by interstellar extinction, so its apparent magnitude is brighter for longer-wavelength passbands; in fact, in visual wavelengths it is completely undetectable.

AFGL 2298 was discovered during the US Air Force Geophysical Laboratory (AFGL) survey, a rocket based infrared sky survey conducted at Hanscom Air Force Base, whose results were published in 1975.

AFGL 2298 has an absolute bolometric magnitude of −11.25, making it one of the most luminous stars known. Indeed, many of the hottest and most luminous stars known are luminous blue variables and other early-type stars. However, like all LBVs, AFGL 2298 is highly variable and the bolometric magnitude refers to its peak luminosity. Its status as an LBV was confirmed in 2003.

Like most extremely massive stars, AFGL 2298 is undergoing mass loss. For example, in 2005 it was estimated to be losing 3.7×10^{−5} solar masses each year, although the rate of mass loss itself varies frequently and dramatically. The stellar mass is currently being ejected as a nebula around the star (similar to AG Carinae), which was imaged by the Very Large Telescope in 2010. The nebula was found to be fairly circular, and the properties of the dust appeared to be constant throughout the entire nebula.

Properties of AFGL 2298 over time
| | Effective temperature (K) | Mass loss rate (M_{☉}/yr) | Bolometric luminosity (L_{☉}) |
|---|---|---|---|
| June 2001 | 11,700 | 4.5×10^{−5} | 1.5×10^{6} |
| August 2002 | 10,900 | 1.2×10^{−4} | 1.3×10^{6} |
| June 2006 | 10,300 | 5.2×10^{−5} | 2.0×10^{6} |
| May 2007 | 10,900 | 4×10^{−5} | 1.5×10^{6} |

== See also ==
- AG Carinae
- List of most luminous stars
