= HR Carinae =

Star in the constellation Carina

HR Car
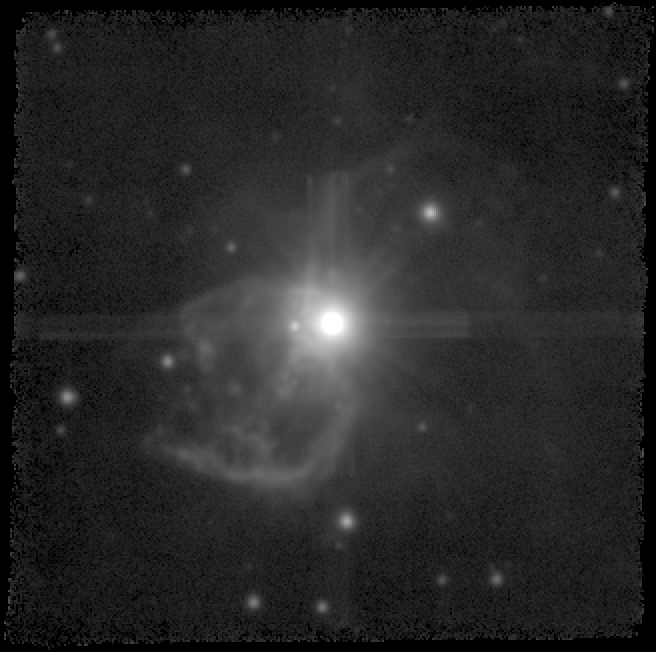
- HR Carinae and its nebula in Hydrogen-alpha with MUSE

Observation data Epoch J2000.0 Equinox ICRS
- Constellation: Carina
- Right ascension: 10^{h} 22^{m} 53.84301^{s}
- Declination: −59° 37′ 28.3636″
- Apparent magnitude (V): 6.95–8.80

Characteristics
- Spectral type: LBV + RSG
- U−B color index: −0.22
- B−V color index: +0.92
- Variable type: LBV

Astrometry
Proper motion (μ)	RA: –6.319 mas/yr Dec.: +2.332 mas/yr
Parallax (π)	0.2032±0.0166 mas
Distance	16,000 ± 1,000 ly (4,900 ± 400 pc)
Absolute magnitude (M_{V})	−9.4

Orbit
Period (P)	4557.5±21.0 days
Semi-major axis (a)	3.324±0.026" (18 AU)
Eccentricity (e)	0.4±0.2
Inclination (i)	119.2±0.7°

Details

LBV
Mass	25–40 M_{☉}
Radius	220±60 (100–350) R_{☉}
Luminosity	416,000–790,000 L_{☉}
Temperature	7,900–21,900 K
Rotational velocity (v sin i)	150 km/s

RSG
Mass	9–20 M_{☉}
Radius	500±150 R_{☉}
Temperature	3,600–4,000 K

Other designations
- HR Car, HD 90177, HIP 50843, SAO 238005, CD-59 3044, GC 14276, MWC 202, AAVSO 1019-59

Database references
SIMBAD	data

HR Carinae is a luminous blue variable star located in the constellation Carina. It is surrounded by a vast nebula of ejected nuclear-processed material because this star has a multiple shell expanding atmosphere. This star is among the most luminous stars in the Milky Way. It has very broad emission wings on the Balmer lines, reminiscent from the broad lines observed in the spectra of O and Wolf–Rayet stars. A distance of 5 kpc and a bolometric magnitude of −9.4 put HR Car among the most luminous stars of the galaxy.

== Discovery ==
HR Carinae was first noticed at the start of the 20th century because of its H_{β} emission. It was placed in Secchi class I, corresponding to modern A and F-type stars. It was catalogued in 1933 as a Be star and was discovered to be variable in 1940. A more detailed spectroscopic study gave it the type B2eq with emission line of hydrogen, helium, and ionised iron and P Cygni profiles on some lines.

By 1970, HR Carinae and the similar variable AG Carinae were recognised as being related to the P Cygni variables, unstable hot supergiants. The group was formally recognised as S Doradus variables to avoid confusion with the P Cygni spectral features shared with other types of star. HR Carinae became one of the best-studied examples of the class, clearly showing the brightness and spectral variations that came to characterise the stars known as luminous blue variables.

== Brightness variation ==
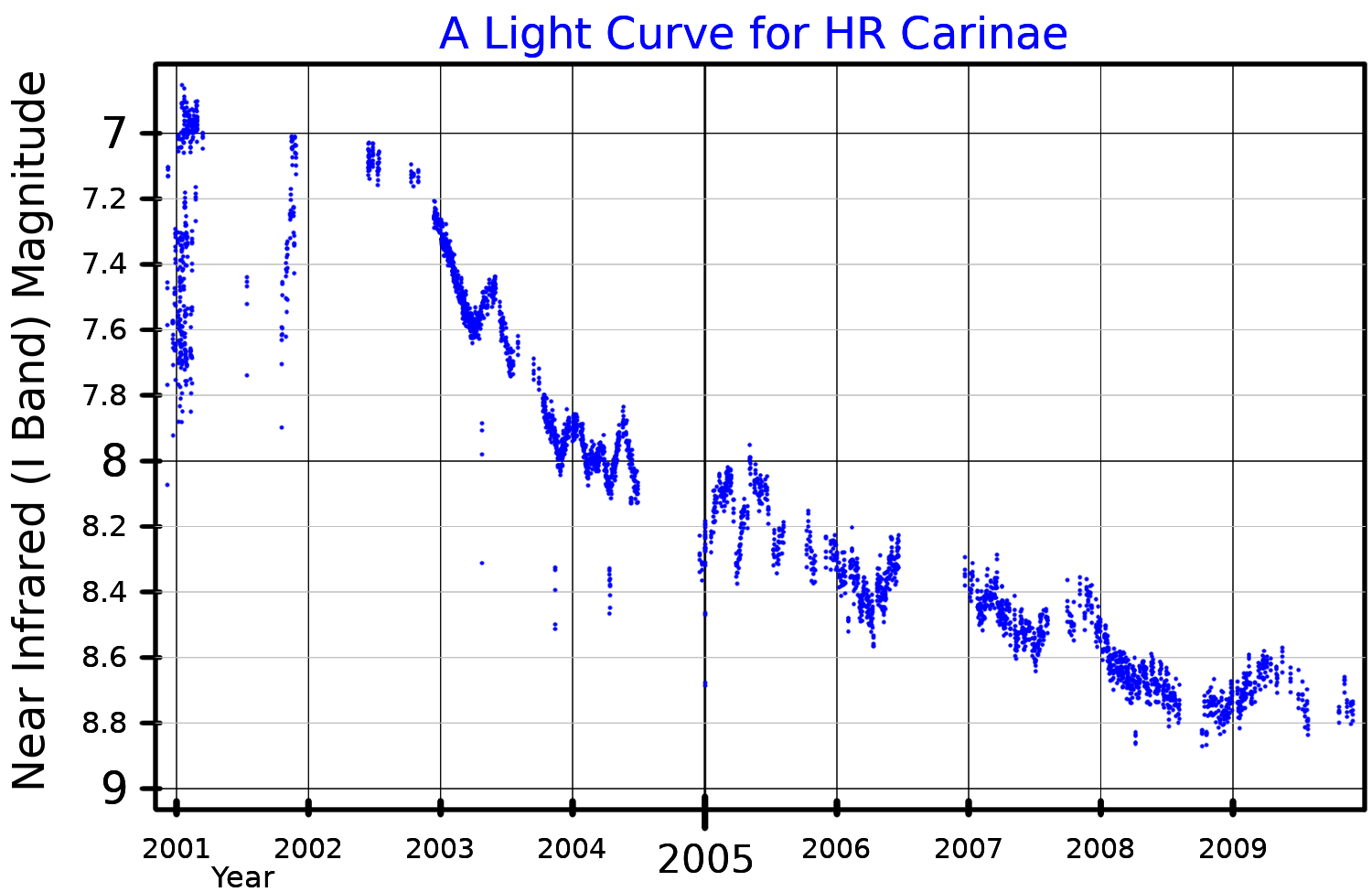
An I band (near infrared) light curve for HR Carinae, plotted from ASAS data

HR Carinae undergoes spectral variations apparently correlated with the light variations similarly to other luminous blue variables. It has undergone several outbursts during which the visual brightness increases and the temperature drops, but the bolometric luminosity remains approximately constant. The visual brightness increased erratically but consistently during the later decades of the 20th century to a record peak of mag 6.8, then dropped straight to a record minimum of mag 8.8 by 2010.

== Characteristics ==
HR Carinae has a temperature around 21,000 K when quiescent and the spectrum is of an early B hypergiant, but in outburst it cools to below 8,000 K.

HR Carinae is a lot like Eta Carinae, both luminous blue variables, and both surrounded by ejected material. HR Carinae is also likely to be a binary system with a similar separation, period, and ratio of component sizes to Eta Carinae. However, the Eta Carinae system is more massive and more luminous.

It has been identified as a possible type IIb supernova candidate in modelling of the fate of stars 20 to 25 times the mass of the Sun (with LBV status as the predicted final stage beforehand).

== Binary system ==
AMBER and PIONIER interferometry has shown that HR Carinae is a binary star system. The orbit is only weakly constrained but the most likely orbit has a semi-major axis of 3.3 mas, eccentricity of 0.4, and a period of 12.5 years. The possible orbits vary from nearly circular orbits of just a few years to highly eccentric orbits of several hundred years, all with the closest separation of the two stars at about 2 mas.

The companion appears to be larger than the primary LBV star, but much less bright. It is most likely a red supergiant with an angular diameter of 0.85±0.20 mas, translating to a radius about 500±150 R_{☉}, and also with a mass of 9–20 M_{☉} and a temperature of 3,600–4,000 K. The diameter of the primary star was also measured directly at 0.38±0.08 mas, corresponding to a radius of 220±60 R_{☉} at 5.4 kpc.
