= Luminous blue variable =

Type of star that is luminous, blue, and variable in brightness

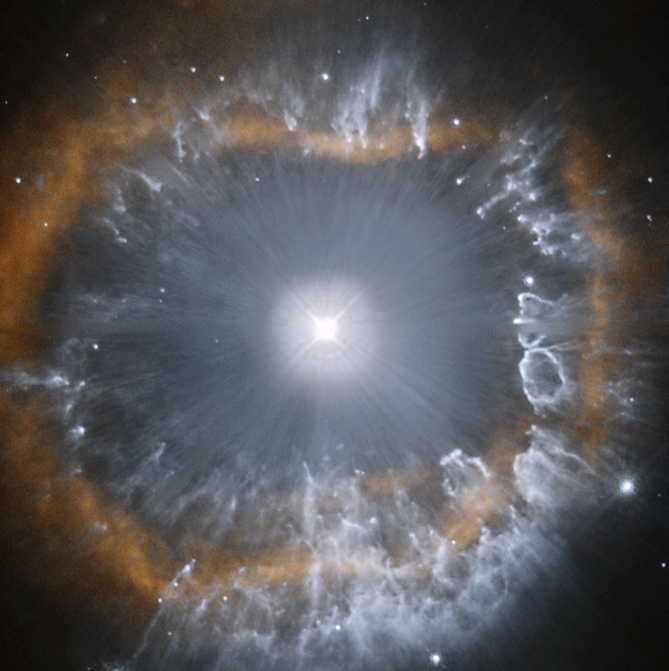
Luminous blue variable AG Carinae as seen by the Hubble Space Telescope

Luminous blue variables (LBVs) are rare, massive, evolved stars that show unpredictable and sometimes dramatic variations in their spectra and brightness. They are also known as S Doradus variables after S Doradus, one of the brightest stars of the Large Magellanic Cloud.

== Discovery and history ==
P Cygni profile of a spectral line

The LBV stars P Cygni and η Carinae have been known as unusual variables since the 17th century, but their true nature was not fully understood until late in the 20th century.

In 1922 John Charles Duncan published the first three variable stars ever detected in an external galaxy, variables 1, 2, and 3, in the Triangulum Galaxy (M33). These were followed up by Edwin Hubble with three more in 1926: A, B, and C in M33. Then in 1929 Hubble added a list of variables detected in M31. Of these, Var A, Var B, Var C, and Var 2 in M33 and Var 19 in M31 were followed up with a detailed study by Hubble and Allan Sandage in 1953. Var 1 in M33 was excluded as being too faint and Var 3 had already been classified as a Cepheid variable. At the time they were simply described as irregular variables, although remarkable for being the brightest stars in those galaxies. The original Hubble Sandage paper contains a footnote that S Doradus might be the same type of star, but expressed strong reservations, so the link would have to wait several decades to be confirmed.

Later papers referred to these five stars as Hubble–Sandage variables. In the 1970s, Var 83 in M33 and AE Andromedae, AF Andromedae (=Var 19), Var 15, and Var A-1 in M31 were added to the list and described by several authors as "luminous blue variables", although it was not considered a formal name at the time. The spectra were found to contain lines with P Cygni profiles and were compared to η Carinae. In 1978, Roberta M. Humphreys published a study of eight variables in M31 and M33 (excluding Var A) and referred to them as luminous blue variables, as well as making the link to the S Doradus class of variable stars. In 1984 in a presentation at the IAU symposium, Peter Conti formally grouped the S Doradus variables, Hubble–Sandage variables, η Carinae, P Cygni, and other similar stars together under the term "luminous blue variables" and shortened it to LBV. He also clearly separated them from those other luminous blue stars, the Wolf–Rayet stars.

Variable star types are usually named after the first member discovered to be variable, for example δ Sct variables named after the star δ Sct. The first luminous blue variable to be identified as a variable star was P Cygni, and these stars have been referred to as P Cygni type variables. The General Catalogue of Variable Stars decided there was a possibility of confusion with P Cygni profiles, which also occur in other types of stars, and chose the acronym SDOR for "variables of the S Doradus type". The term "S Doradus variable" was used to describe P Cygni, S Doradus, η Carinae, and the Hubble-Sandage variables as a group in 1974.

== Physical properties ==
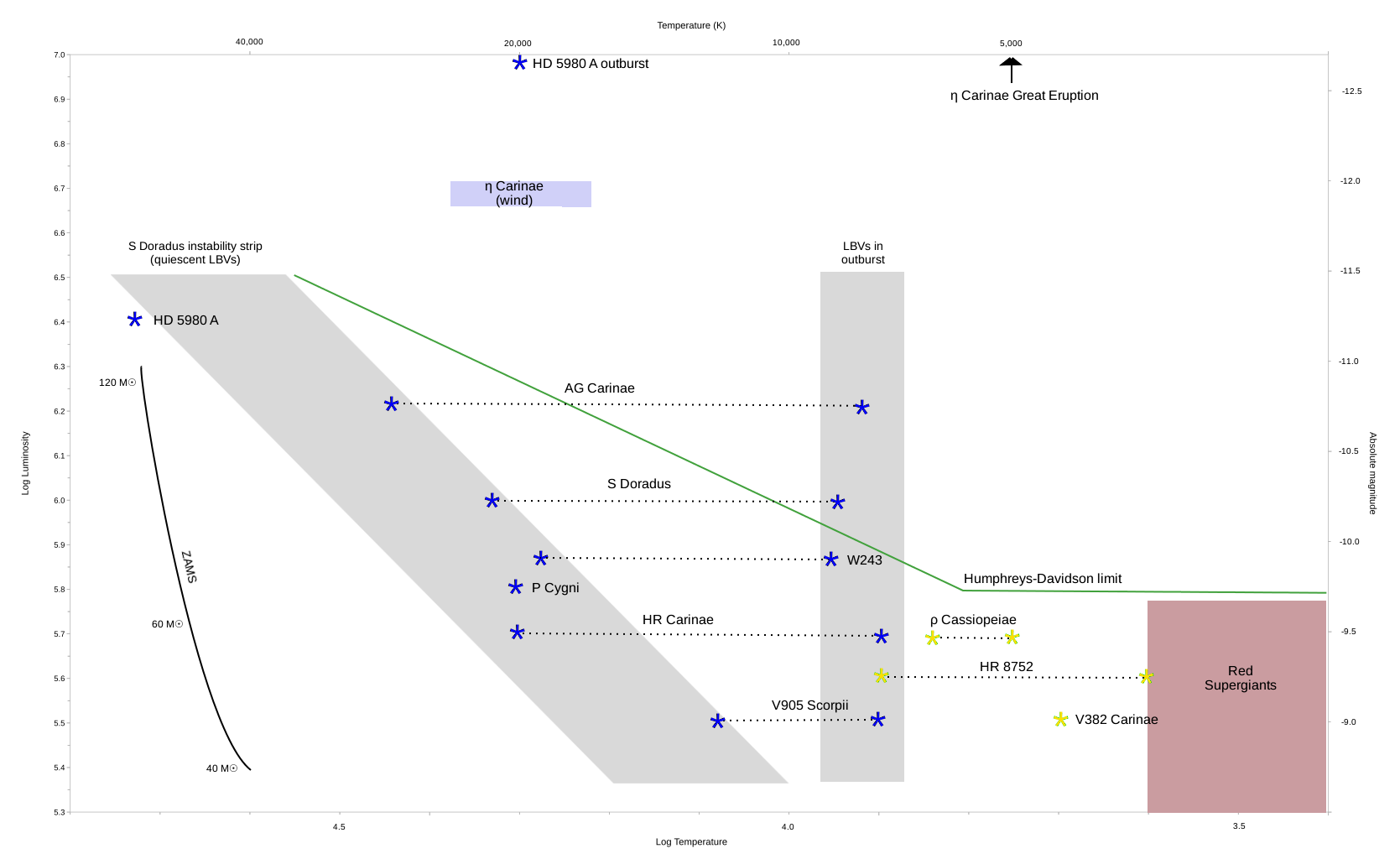
Upper portion of H-R Diagram showing the location of the S Doradus instability strip and the location of LBV outbursts. Main sequence is the thin sloping line on the lower left.

LBVs are massive unstable supergiant (or hypergiant) stars that show a variety of spectroscopic and photometric variation, most obviously periodic outbursts and occasional much larger eruptions.

In their "quiescent" state they are typically B-type stars, occasionally slightly hotter, with unusual emission lines. They are found in a region of the Hertzsprung–Russell diagram known as the S Doradus instability strip, where the least luminous have a temperature around 10,000 K and a luminosity about 250,000 times that of the Sun, whereas the most luminous have a temperature around 25,000 K and a luminosity over a million times that of the Sun, making them some of the most luminous of all stars.

During a normal outburst the temperature decreases to around 8,500 K for all stars, slightly hotter than the yellow hypergiants. The bolometric luminosity usually remains constant, which means that visual brightness increases somewhat by a magnitude or two. A few examples have been found where luminosity appears to change during an outburst, but the properties of these unusual stars are difficult to determine accurately. For example, AG Carinae may decrease in luminosity by around 30% during outbursts; and AFGL 2298 has been observed to dramatically increase its luminosity during an outburst although it is not clear if that should be classified as a modest giant eruption. S Doradus typifies this behaviour, which has been referred to as strong-active cycle, and it is regarded as a key criterion for identifying luminous blue variables. Two distinct periodicities are seen, either variations taking longer than 20 years, or less than 10 years. In some cases, the variations are much smaller, less than half a magnitude, with only small temperature reductions. These are referred to as weak-active cycles and always occur on timescales of less than 10 years.

Some LBVs have been observed to undergo giant eruptions with dramatically increased mass loss and luminosity, so violent that several were initially catalogued as supernovae. The outbursts mean there are usually nebulae around such stars; η Carinae is the best-studied and most luminous known example, but may not be typical. It is generally assumed that all luminous blue variables undergo one or more of these large eruptions, but they have only been observed in two or three well-studied stars and a handful of supernova imposters (such as SN 2009ip, which later evolved into a true supernova). The two clear examples in the Milky Way galaxy, P Cygni and η Carinae, and the possible example in the Small Magellanic Cloud, HD 5980A, have not shown strong-cycle variations. It is still possible that the two types of variability occur in different groups of stars. 3-D simulations have shown that these outbursts may be caused by variations in helium opacity.

Many luminous blue variables also show small amplitude variability with periods less than a year, which appears typical of Alpha Cygni variables, and stochastic (i.e. totally random) variations.

Luminous blue variables are by definition more luminous than most stars and also more massive, but within a very wide range. The most luminous are more than a million L_{☉} (Eta Carinae reaches 4.6 million) and have masses approaching, possibly exceeding, 100 M_{☉}. The least luminous have luminosities around a quarter of a million L_{☉} and masses as low as 10 M_{☉}, although they would have been considerably more massive as main-sequence stars, due to their rapid mass loss. Their high mass loss rates could be due to outbursts and very high luminosity and show some enhancement of helium and nitrogen.

== Evolution ==
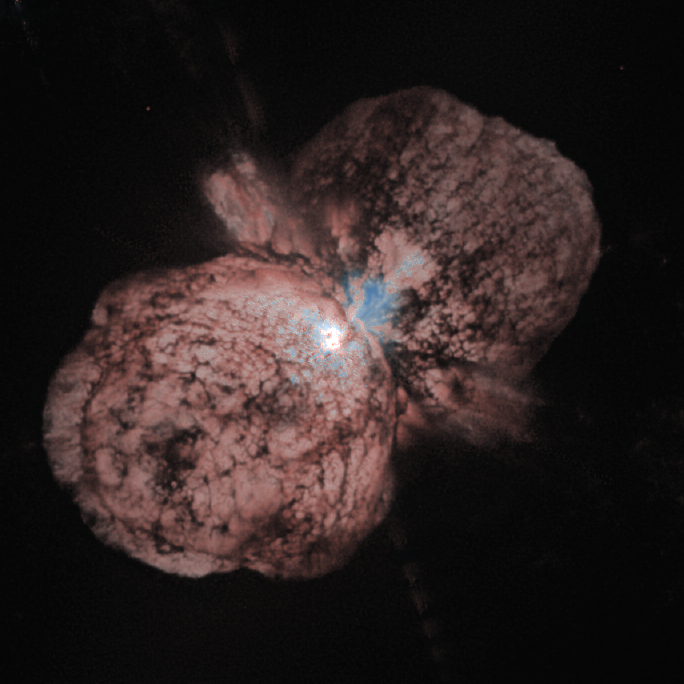
The Homunculus Nebula, produced by the Great Outburst of η Carinae

Because of these stars' large mass and high luminosity, their lifetime is very short—only a few million years in total and much less than a million years in the LBV phase. They are rapidly evolving on observable timescales; examples have been detected where stars with Wolf–Rayet spectra (WNL/Ofpe) have developed to show LBV outbursts and a handful of supernovae have been traced to likely LBV progenitors. Some models suggest the latter scenario, where luminous blue variable stars are the final evolutionary stage of some massive stars before they explode as supernovae, for at least stars with initial masses between 20 and 25 solar masses. For more-massive stars, computer simulations of their evolution suggest the luminous blue variable phase takes place during the latest phases of core hydrogen burning (LBV with high surface temperature), the hydrogen shell burning phase (LBV with lower surface temperature), and the earliest part of the core helium burning phase (LBV with high surface temperature again) before transitioning to the Wolf–Rayet phase, thus being analogous to the red giant and red supergiant phases of less massive stars.

There appear to be two groups of LBVs, one with luminosities above 630,000 times the Sun and the other with luminosities below 400,000 times the Sun, although this is disputed in more recent research. Models have been constructed showing that the lower-luminosity group are post-red-supergiants with initial masses of 30–60 times the Sun, whereas the higher-luminosity group are population-II stars with initial masses 60–90 times the Sun that never develop to red supergiants, although they may become yellow hypergiants. Some models suggest that LBVs are a stage in the evolution of very massive stars required for them to shed excess mass, whereas others require that most of the mass is lost at an earlier cool-supergiant stage. Normal outbursts and the stellar winds in the quiescent state are not sufficient for the required mass loss, but LBVs occasionally produce abnormally large outbursts that can be mistaken for a faint supernova and these may shed the necessary mass. Recent models all agree that the LBV stage occurs after the main-sequence stage and before the hydrogen-depleted Wolf–Rayet stage, and that essentially all LBV stars will eventually explode as supernovae. LBVs apparently can explode directly as a supernova, but probably only a small fraction do. If the star does not lose enough mass before the end of the LBV stage, it may undergo a particularly powerful supernova created by pair-instability. The latest models of stellar evolution suggest that some single stars with initial masses around 20 times that of the Sun will explode as LBVs as Type II-P, Type IIb, or Type Ib supernovae, whereas binary stars undergo much-more-complex evolution through envelope stripping leading to less predictable outcomes.

== Supernova-like outbursts ==
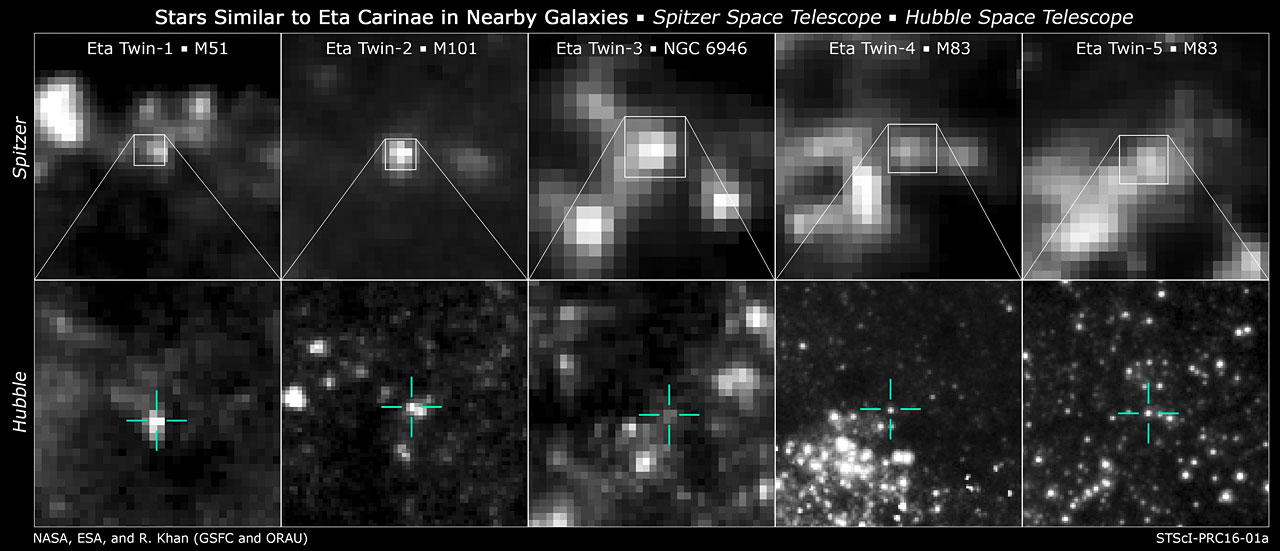
Stars similar to η Carinae in nearby galaxies

Luminous blue variable stars can undergo "giant outbursts" with dramatically increased mass loss and luminosity. η Carinae is the prototypical example, with P Cygni showing one or more similar outbursts 300–400 years ago, but dozens have now been catalogued in external galaxies. Many of these were initially classified as supernovae but re-examined because of unusual features. The nature of the outbursts and of the progenitor stars seems to be highly variable, with the outbursts most likely having several different causes. The historical η Carinae and P Cygni outbursts, and several seen more recently in external galaxies, have lasted years or decades whereas some of the supernova impostor events have declined to normal brightness within months. Well-studied examples are:

- SN 1954J
- SN 1961V
- SN 1997bs

Early models of stellar evolution had predicted that although the high-mass stars that produce LBVs would often or always end their lives as supernovae, the supernova explosion would not occur at the LBV stage. Prompted by the progenitor of SN 1987A being a blue supergiant, and most likely an LBV, several subsequent supernovae have been associated with LBV progenitors. The progenitor of SN 2005gl has been shown to be an LBV apparently in outburst only a few years earlier. Progenitors of several other Type IIn supernovae have been detected and were likely to have been LBVs:

- SN 2009ip
- SN 2010jl

Modelling suggests that at near-solar metallicity, stars with an initial mass around 20–25 M_{☉} will explode as a supernova while in the LBV stage of their lives. They will be post-red-supergiants with luminosities a few hundred thousand times that of the Sun. The supernova is expected to be of Type II, most likely Type IIb, although possibly Type IIn due to episodes of enhanced mass loss that occur as an LBV and in the yellow-hypergiant stage.

== List of LBVs ==
The identification of LBVs requires confirmation of the characteristic spectral and photometric variations, but these stars can be "quiescent" for decades or centuries at which time they are indistinguishable from many other hot luminous stars. A candidate luminous blue variable (cLBV) can be identified relatively quickly on the basis of its spectrum or luminosity, and dozens have been catalogued in the Milky Way during recent surveys.

Recent studies of dense clusters and mass spectrographic analysis of luminous stars have identified dozens of probable LBVs in the Milky Way out of a likely total population of just a few hundred, although few have been observed in enough detail to confirm the characteristic types of variability. In addition the majority of the LBVs in the Magellanic Clouds have been identified, several dozen in M31 and M33, plus a handful in other local group galaxies.

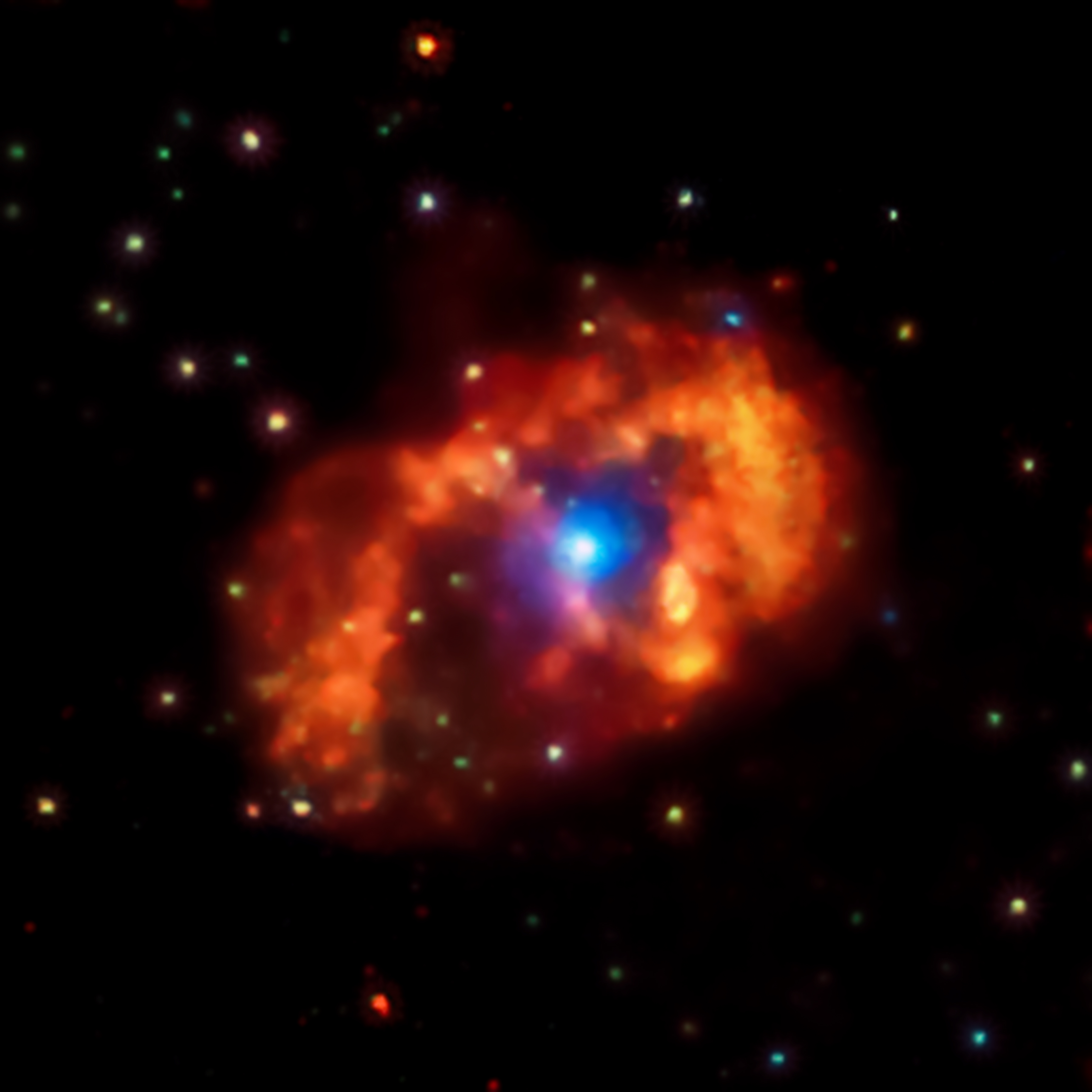
η Carinae, a luminous blue variable as seen from the Chandra X-ray Observatory

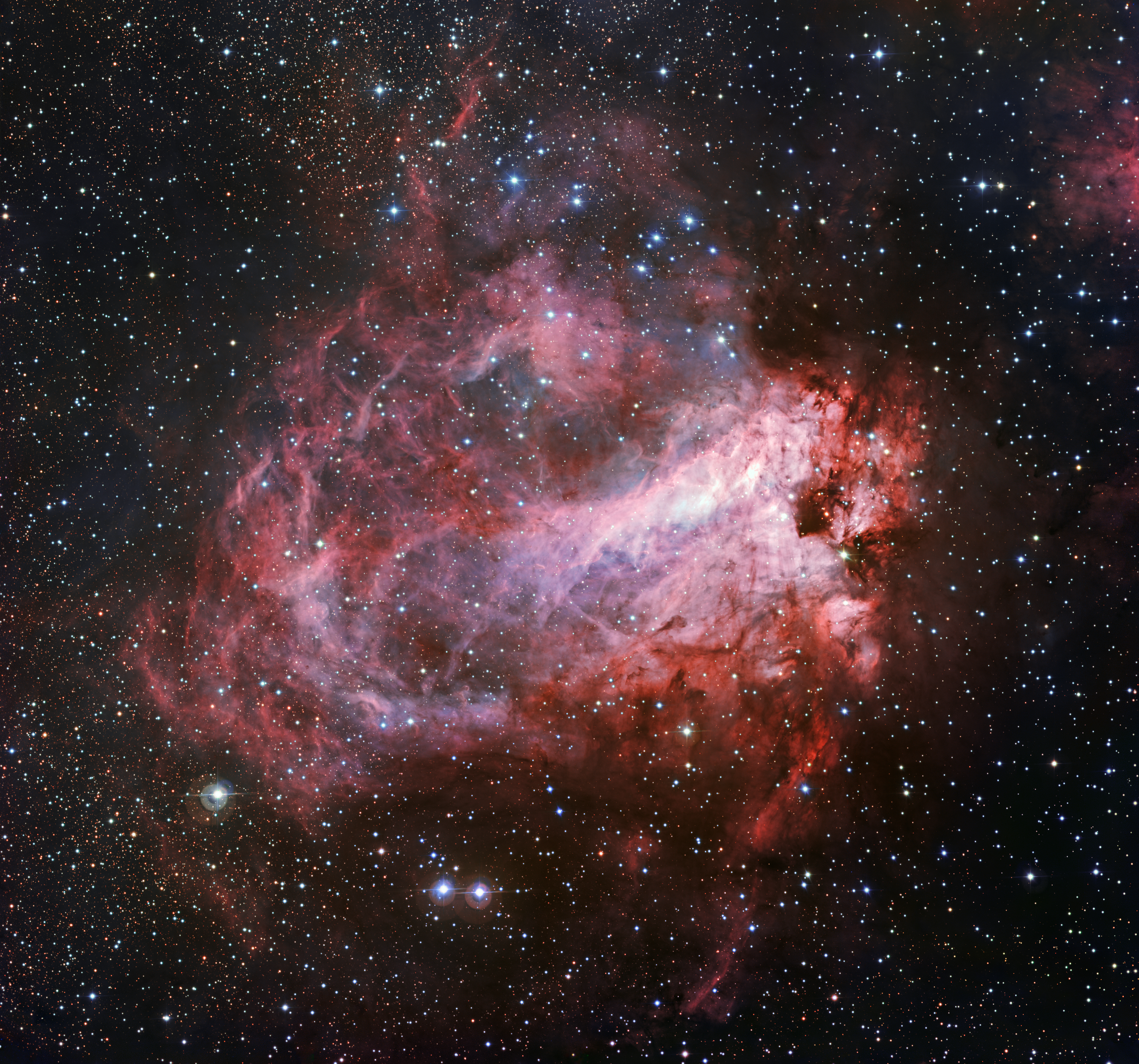
HD 168607 is the right star of the pair below the Omega Nebula. The other is the hypergiant HD 168625.

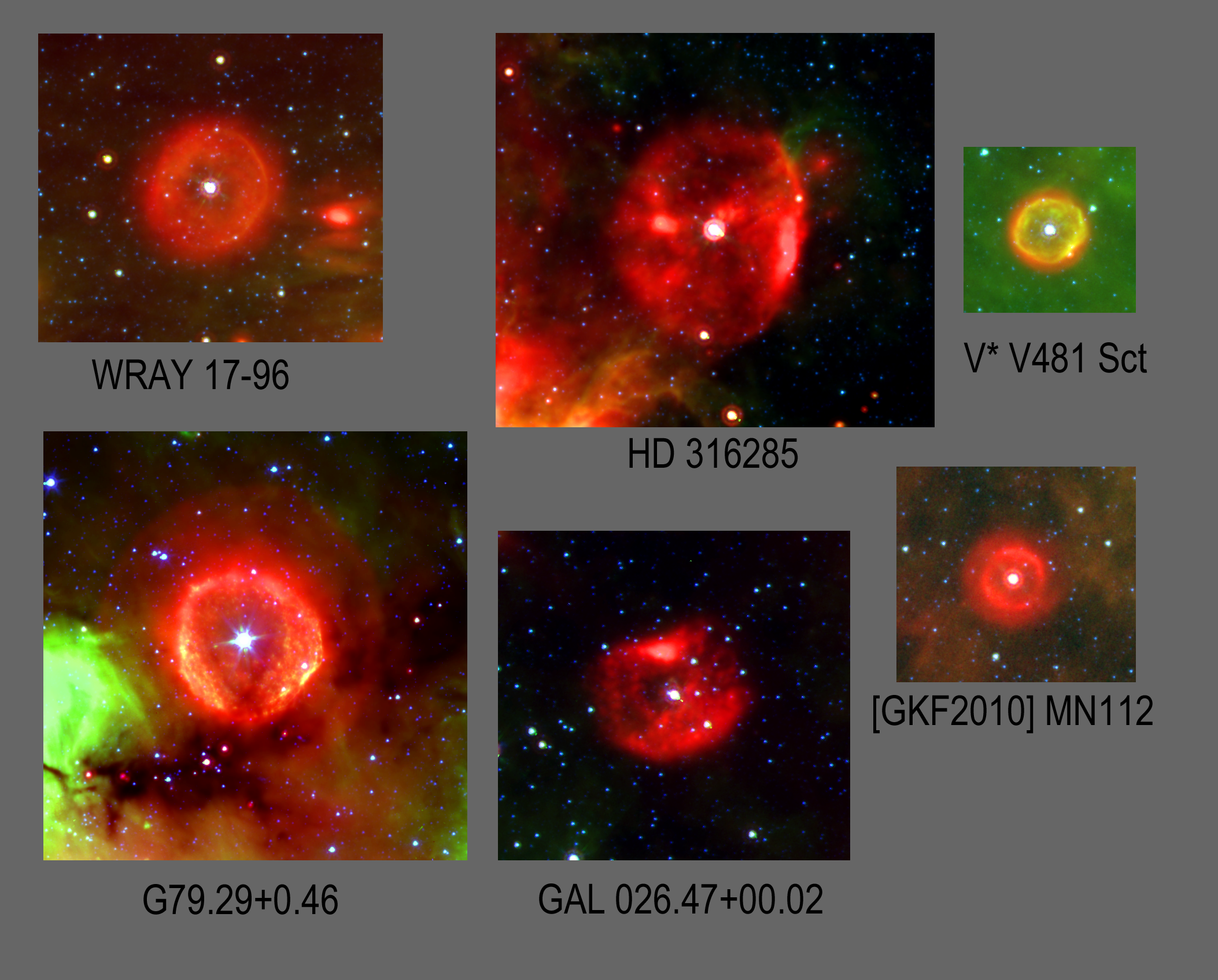
A selection of LBVs and suspected LBVs with nebula, observed with the Spitzer Space Telescope.

=== Milky Way ===
- η Carinae
- P Cygni
- Zeta^{1} Scorpii
- AG Carinae
- HR Carinae
- V432 Carinae (Wray 15-751)
- V4029 Sagittarii (HD 168607)
- V905 Scorpii (HD 160529)
- V1672 Aquilae (AFGL 2298)
- W1-243 (in Westerlund 1)
- V481 Scuti (LBV G24.73+0.69)
- GCIRS 34W
- MWC 930 (= V446 Scuti)
- Wray 16-137
- WS1 (discovered as WISE Shell 1)
- MN44
- MN48

Candidates:

- G79.29+0.46
- Wray 17-96
- HD 316285
- MN 112
- GAL 026.47+00.02

Several more LBV's have been found near or in the Galactic Center:

- V4650 Sagittarii (FMM 362 or qF362, in the Quintuplet Cluster)
- V4998 Sagittarii (LBV3, G0.120 0.048, very close to the Quintuplet Cluster)
- Pistol Star, Peony star and LBV 1806-20 (candidate LBV's, see below)

=== Large Magellanic Cloud ===
- S Doradus
- HD 269858 (= R127)
- HD 269006 (= R71)
- HD 269929 (= R143)
- HD 269662 (= R110)
- HD 269700 (= R116)
- HD 269582 (= MWC 112)
- HD 269216
- HD 37836 (candidate)

=== Small Magellanic Cloud ===
- HD 5980 (= R14)
- HD 6884 (= R40)

=== Andromeda Galaxy ===
- AF Andromedae
- AE Andromedae
- Var 15
- Var A-1
- J004526.62+415006.3
- J004051.59+403303.0
- LAMOST J0037+4016

=== Triangulum Galaxy ===
- Var 2 (an extremely hot star showing no variability since 1935 and hardly studied)
- Var 83
- Var B
- Var C
- GR 290 (Romano's star, an unusually hot LBV)

NGC 2403:

- V12
- V37
- V38

=== NGC 1156 ===
- J025941.21+251412.2
- J025941.54+251421.8

=== NGC 2363 ===
- NGC 2363-V1

=== NGC 4449 ===
- J122809.72+440514.8
- J122817.83+440630.8

=== NGC 4559 ===
- AT 2016blu, which has had multiple outbursts since its discovery in the year 2012.

=== NGC 4736 (Messier 94) ===
- NGC 4736_1

=== PHL 293B ===
- Unnamed star that underwent an outburst from 1998 to 2008 in an unusual supernova-like event, and has now disappeared

=== Sunburst galaxy ===
- Godzilla

=== Other ===
A number of cLBVs in the Milky Way (and in the case of Sanduleak -69° 202, in the LMC) are well known because of their extreme luminosity or unusual characteristics, including:

- GCIRS 16SW (S97, candidate LBV orbiting the black hole at the center of this galaxy)
- Wray 17-96 (unusual hypergiant in the gap between the two semi-stable LBV regions)
- Pistol Star (once thought to be the most luminous star in the galaxy)
- LBV 1806-20 (one of the most luminous stars known)
- Sanduleak -69° 202 (the star that exploded as SN 1987A)
- Cygnus OB2-12 (blue hypergiant and one of the most luminous stars known)
- HD 80077 (blue hypergiant)
- V1429 Aquilae (with a supergiant companion, very similar to a less luminous η Car)
- V4030 Sagittarii (hypergiant surrounded by a nebula identical to the one around Sanduleak -69° 202)
- WR 102ka (the Peony star, one of the most luminous stars known, and would be one of the hottest LBVs)
- Sher 25 (blue supergiant in NGC 3603 with a bipolar outflow and surrounded by a circumstellar ring)
- BD+40°4210 (blue supergiant in the stellar association Cygnus OB2)

== See also ==
- Hypernova
- Hypergiant
