= Var 83 =

Luminous blue variable star in the constellation Triangulum

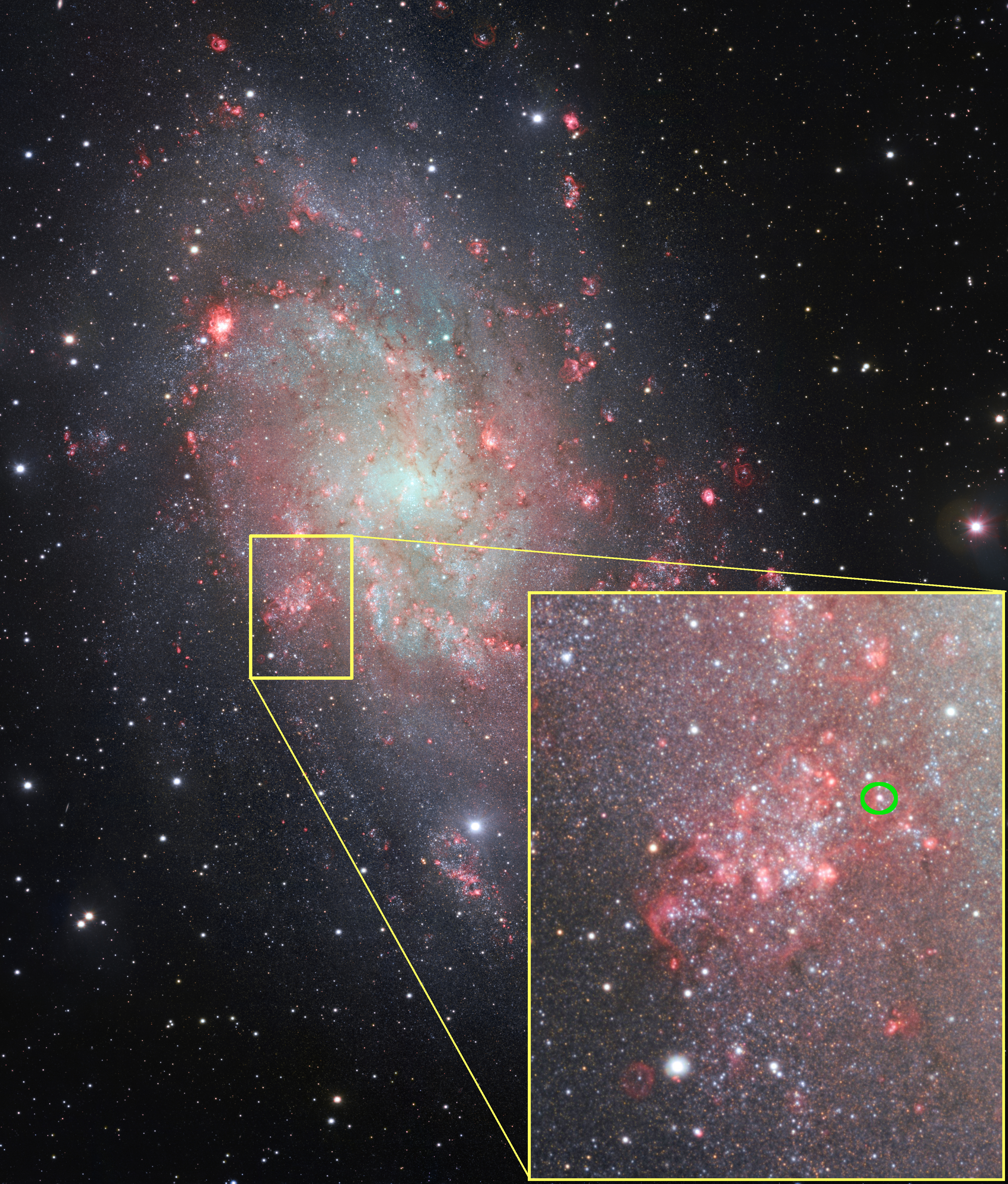
- Location of Var 83 (circled in green) within M33

Observation data Epoch J2000 Equinox ICRS
- Constellation: Triangulum
- Right ascension: 01^{h} 33^{m} 50.02^{s}
- Declination: +30° 39′ 36.7″
- Apparent magnitude (V): 15.4-16.6

Characteristics
- Evolutionary stage: LBV
- Spectral type: LBV
- U−B color index: ~−0.9
- B−V color index: ~+0.1
- Variable type: LBV

Astrometry
Proper motion (μ)	RA: +11.54 mas/yr Dec.: −2.75 mas/yr
Distance	~3,000,000 ly (~900,000 pc)
Absolute magnitude (M_{V})	−8.4- −9.5

Details
Radius	150 R_{☉}
Luminosity	2,100,000-4,500,000 L_{☉}
Temperature	18,000-37,000 K

Other designations
- M33 Var 83, VHK 83, 2MASS J01341090+3034373

Database references
SIMBAD	data

VHK 83 (Var 83 in the VHK survey) is a luminous blue variable (LBV) in the constellation Triangulum, in the Triangulum Galaxy. With its bolometric luminosity of at least 2,240,000 times that of the Sun (4,500,000 in some estimates), it was described as "the brightest nonstable star in M33" and is one of the most luminous stars known.

The brightness varies slowly and unpredictably over a 1-2 magnitude visual range and can remain approximately constant for many years. These variations, combined with the high luminosity and temperature of the star, caused it to be grouped with the Hubble-Sandage variables even before the term "Luminous blue variable" was more than a simple description. Despite widespread agreement that it is an LBV, it has yet to be observed in outburst, although the temperature has been observed to change in tandem with the brightness variations.

Temperature estimates for the star range from around 18,000 K to well over 30,000 K. The hotter temperatures found from fitting the spectral energy distribution (SED) are consistent with the calculated luminosity of an LBV in the quiescent stage, but the spectrum is that of a cooler star.

== See also ==
- List of most massive stars
