= Wray 17-96 =

Star in Scorpius

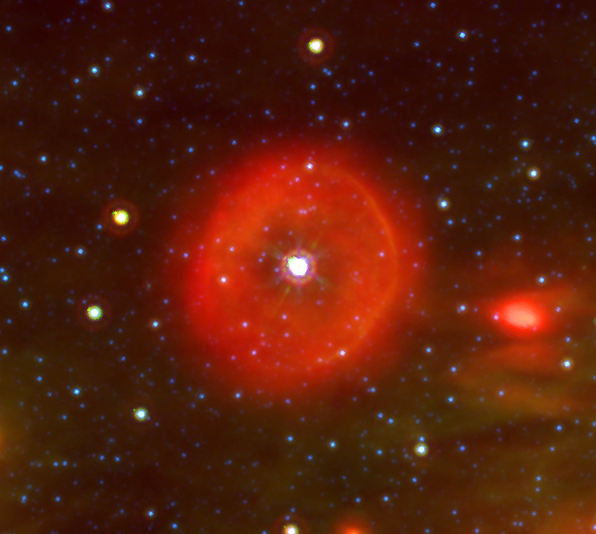
- Gas shell in the mid-infrared around WRAY 17-96; Credit: NASA Spitzer Space Telescope

Observation data Epoch J2000 Equinox ICRS
- Constellation: Scorpius
- Right ascension: 17^{h} 41^{m} 35.436^{s}
- Declination: −30° 06′ 38.78″
- Apparent magnitude (V): ~13.0

Characteristics
- Spectral type: B[e]:
- Apparent magnitude (B): 17.8
- Apparent magnitude (R): 14.23
- Apparent magnitude (J): 6.707
- Apparent magnitude (H): 5.52
- Apparent magnitude (K): 4.796
- Variable type: LBV?

Astrometry
Proper motion (μ)	RA: −0.176 mas/yr Dec.: −1.278 mas/yr
Parallax (π)	0.1457±0.0871 mas
Distance	approx. 20,000 ly (approx. 7,000 pc)

Details
Radius	140 (Note: Calculated, using the Stefan-Boltzmann law and the star's effective temperature and luminosity, with respect to the solar nominal effective temperature of 5,772 K: $$\sqrt{\biggl(\frac{5,772}{20,000}\biggr)^4 \cdot 10^{6.45}} = 308\ R_\odot.$$) R_{☉}
Luminosity	2,820,000 L_{☉}
Temperature	20,000 K

Other designations
- 2MASS J17413543-3006389, Hen 3-1453

Database references
SIMBAD	data

Wray 17-96 is a very luminous star in the constellation Scorpius, about 20,000 light-years (7 kpc) away. It is a suspected luminous blue variable (LBV), although it has not shown the characteristic spectral variations.

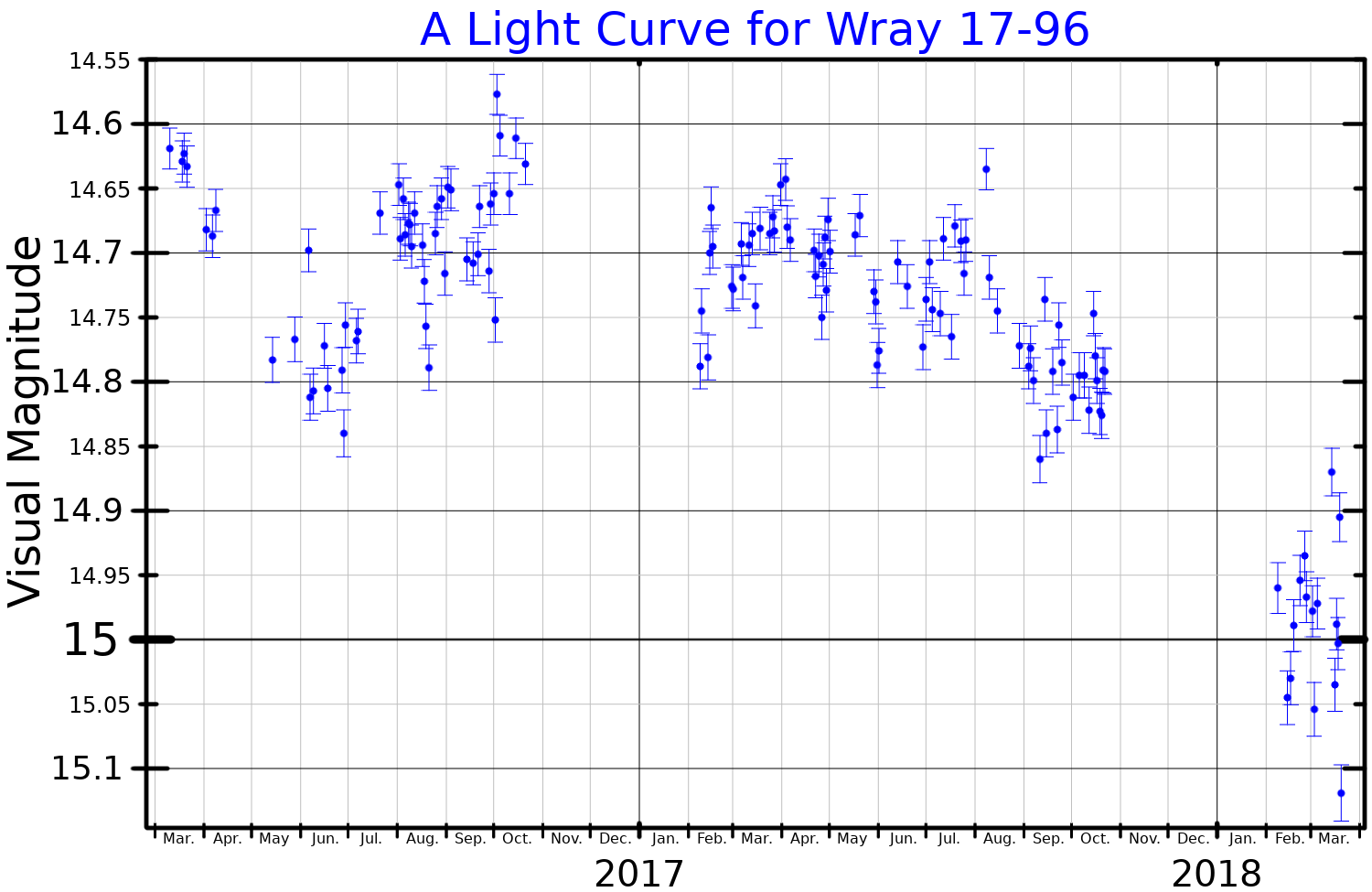
A visual band light curve for Wray 17-96, plotted from ASAS-SN data

Wray 17-96 has an absolute bolometric magnitude of −10.9 (1.8 million times the Sun's luminosity), making it one of the most luminous stars known. The spectral type is peculiar, showing emission and absorption, sometimes both in the same line. Photospheric helium lines are visible indicating that the star is at least somewhat evolved. It is highly reddened by interstellar extinction and the visual brightness is reduced by nearly 9 magnitudes.

Wray 17-96 is also notable for its highly symmetrical ring-shaped 10 M_{☉} gas shell, which was originally classified as a planetary nebula.
