= AF Andromedae =

Luminous blue variable star in the constellation Andromeda

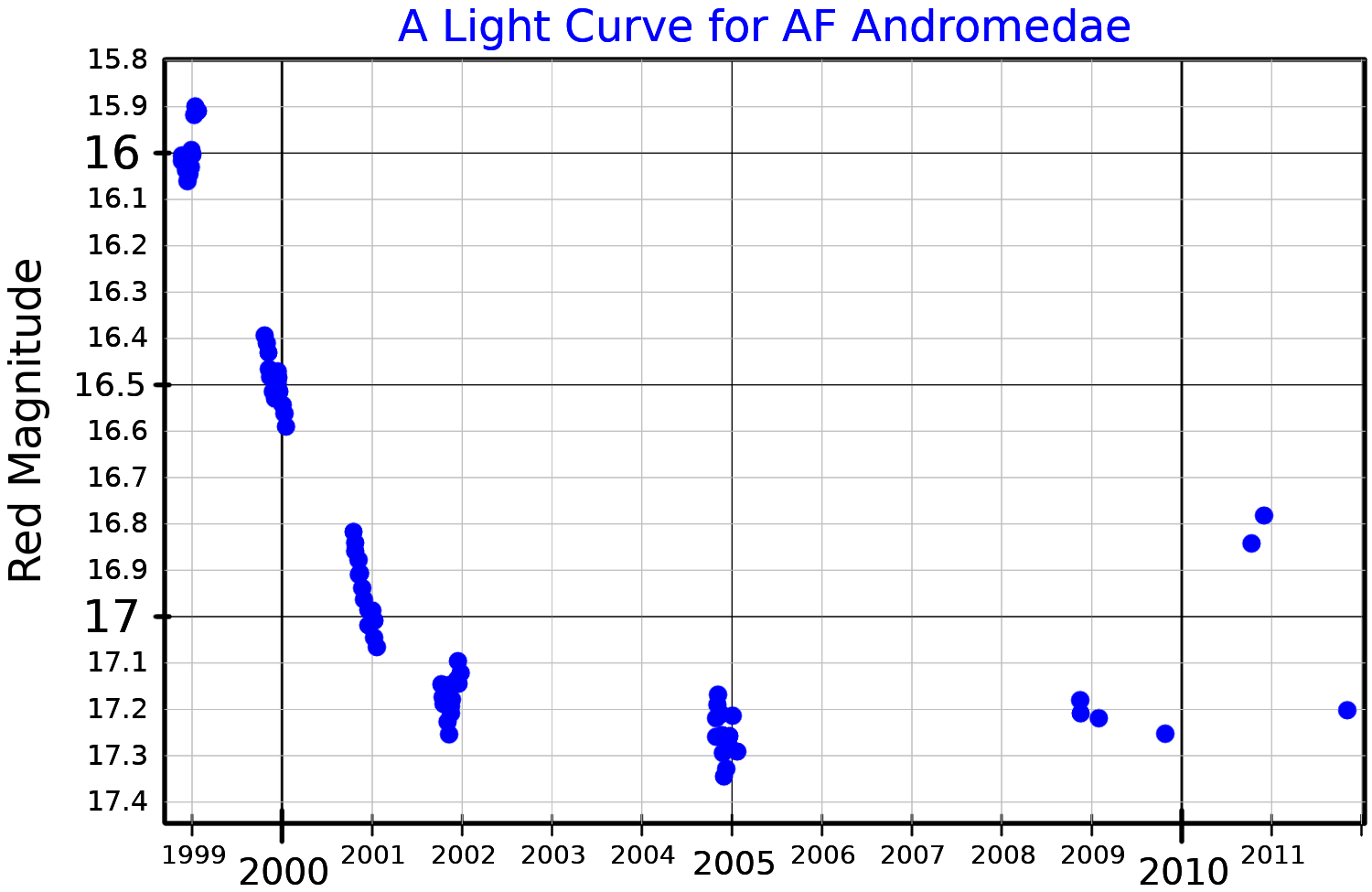
- A red band light curve for AF Andromedae, adapted from Joshi et al. (2019)

Observation data Epoch J2000 Equinox ICRS
- Constellation: Andromeda
- Right ascension: 00^{h} 43^{m} 33.0862^{s}
- Declination: +41° 49′ 10.312″

Characteristics
- Spectral type: LBV
- U−B color index: ~ −0.9
- B−V color index: ~ +0.1
- Variable type: LBV

Astrometry
Radial velocity (R_{v})	−152±9 km/s
Proper motion (μ)	RA: 0.088 mas/yr Dec.: −0.076 mas/yr
Parallax (π)	−0.0026±0.0674 mas
Distance	~2.5Mly ly (~780kpc pc)
Absolute magnitude (M_{V})	−8.2

Details
Mass	50–120 M_{☉}
Radius	63 R_{☉}
Luminosity	501,000 L_{☉}
Temperature	33,000±3,000 K (normal); 7,000 (outburst) K

Other designations
- AF Andromedae, AF And, HV 4013, 2MASS 00433308+4112103, Var 19

Database references
SIMBAD	data

AF Andromedae (AF And) is a luminous blue variable (LBV), a type of variable star. The star is one of the most luminous variables in M31, the Andromeda Galaxy.

== Discovery ==
The star was discovered to be variable in 1927, with a photographic magnitude range of 15.3 to 16.5, at the Harvard College Observatory and designated HV 4013. It was considered to be the brightest variable star in M31. Two years later it was given the variable star designation AF Andromedae. Between 1917 and 1953, five or six major eruptions were detected and two or three minor ones. More eruptions were observed in 1970–74, 1987–92, 1998–2001, and 2017.

AF And was often referred to as var 19, after its number in a Hubble list of variable stars in M31 and M33. It was identified as one of the five Hubble–Sandage variables: Var A, Var B, Var C, and Var 2 in M33, and Var 19 in M31. On the basis of color–color comparisons, it was assigned as spectral type B and described as related to the P Cygni variables. Observations from 1960 to 1970 showed irregular variations in the B (blue) magnitude between 15.5 and 17.6, with visual magnitudes somewhat brighter. The first detailed spectrum was published in 1975.

== Spectrum ==
AF And in outbursts has a peculiar emission line spectrum described as very much like Eta Carinae, likely due to a dense stellar wind. When quiescent, the spectrum is similar to late Of or WN stars.

AF And has prominent allowed and forbidden Fe_{II} and hydrogen lines in its emission spectrum, as well as weaker He_{I} lines. The variability and lack of absorption lines defy a normal spectral classification, but it was suggested that it may be close to class A.

The 250.7 nm Fe_{II} line is unusually strong in emission. The same feature in Eta Carinae's spectrum has been attributed to a UV laser.

== Properties ==
AF And was the brightest star in M31 when it was first noticed during an outburst, at an apparent magnitude around 15, over a million times more luminous than the Sun. Newer calculations give a luminosity around half a million times that of the Sun.

The star's mass has not been calculated explicitly, but this type of star is massive, typically 50–120 M_{☉}.

== See also ==
- List of Andromeda's satellite galaxies
- M31-RV
