= Romano's Star =

Star in the Triangulum Galaxy

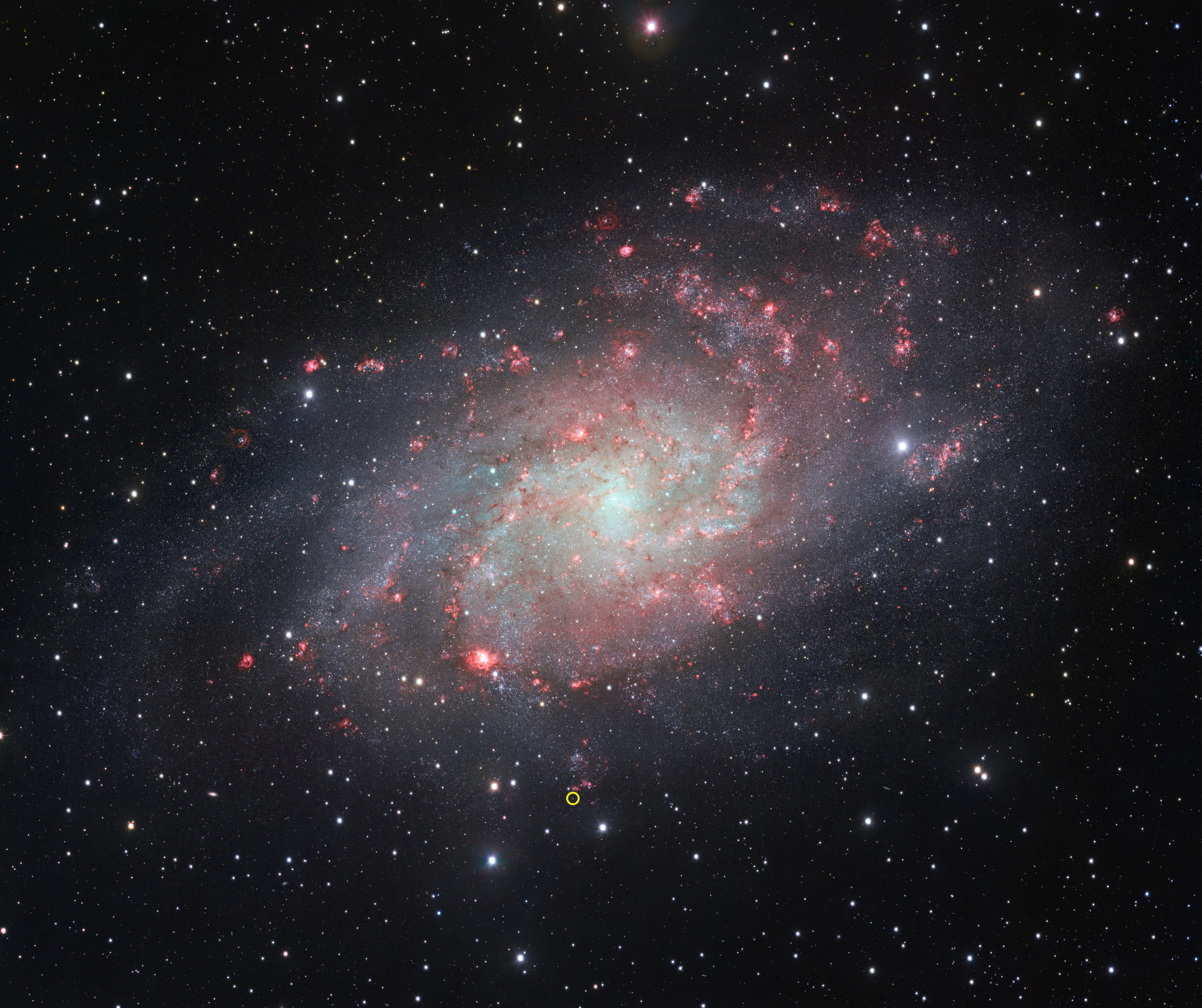
- Location of Romano's Star (below centre, circled, north is to the left)

Observation data Epoch J2000.0 Equinox ICRS
- Constellation: Triangulum
- Right ascension: 01^{h} 35^{m} 09.712^{s}
- Declination: +30° 41′ 56.55″
- Apparent magnitude (V): 16.5–18.8

Characteristics
- Evolutionary stage: WR
- Spectral type: WN8h–WN11h
- B−V color index: −0.1
- Variable type: LBV

Astrometry
Distance	847,000 pc
Absolute magnitude (M_{V})	−7.4 (variable)

Details

Minimum
Radius	23–27 R_{☉}
Luminosity	310,000–370,000 L_{☉}
Temperature	27,000–33,000 K

Maximum
Radius	61 R_{☉}
Luminosity	1.05 million L_{☉}
Temperature	23,500 K
Age	4 Myr

Other designations
- GR 290, 2MASS J01350971+3041565, M33 V532

Database references
SIMBAD	data

Romano's Star /roʊˈmɑːnoʊz/ (GR 290) is a luminous blue variable star located in the Messier 33 galaxy in the constellation of Triangulum.

== Discovery ==
Discovered by Giuliano Romano (1923–2013), whom it was named after, Romano's Star was first reported in 1978 as one of eleven new variable stars in the Triangulum Galaxy. These were numbered from GR 282 to GR 292. GR 290 was described as a Hubble–Sandage variable, more commonly known now as a luminous blue variable (LBV). It was described as varying from photographic magnitude 16.5 to 17.8. The other ten stars were relatively common stars in our own galaxy, but the highly luminous GR 290 was a member of the M33 galaxy and came to be called Romano's Star.

A detailed follow-up study of the new rare type of variable showed that it was 17' from the centre of M33, on the outskirts of the galaxy near one of the spiral arms. On the photographic plates taken between 1960 and 1977, the star is seen to vary irregularly between photographic magnitude 16.5 and 17.8, with quiescent periods in 1960–1961 and 1974 onwards.

A spectroscopic study near minimum brightness in 2003 confirmed the LBV nature of Romano's Star and showed that the spectral type was Of/WN. It is listed in the Extragalactic Variable Stars catalogue as M33 V532.

== Variability ==
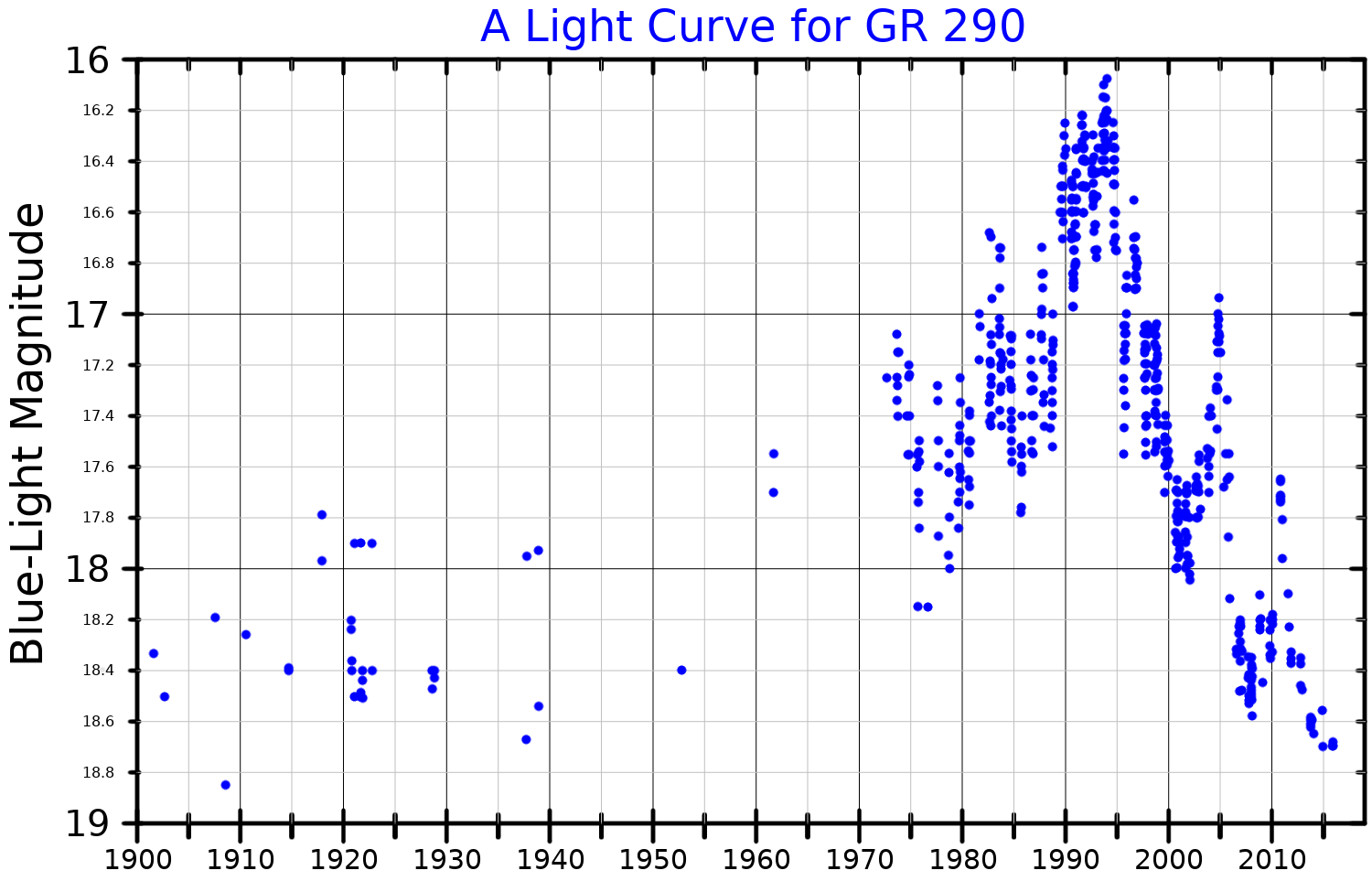
A blue band light curve for GR 290, adapted from Polcaro et al. (2016)

Analysis of historical records show that Romano's Star was likely quiescent from 1900 until five outbursts occurred between 1960 and 2010. The brightness is not constant during maximum but shows variations on a timescale of months. The third of the five outbursts was the brightest, peaking at magnitude 16.5. The minimum brightness in 2014 was the faintest ever recorded at below magnitude 18.7 and the star remained faint into 2016. It has been suggested that the sequence of outbursts is now complete.

== Spectrum ==
The spectrum of GR 290 shows prominent emission lines of hydrogen and atomic helium, along with a broad complex of ionised nitrogen emission lines and weak ionised helium emission. There are also some faint absorption lines attributed to interstellar material, and some forbidden emission lines. Ciii is detectable but much weaker than the nitrogen lines. The spectral type of Romano's Star is that of a Wolf–Rayet star on the nitrogen sequence, but also with hydrogen. It varies in phase with the brightness changes, from WN8h–9h at minimum brightness to WN10h–11h at maximum. Although the spectral type changes, the colour of the star remains roughly constant, as measured by the B–V and U–B colour indices.

== Properties ==
The effective temperature of Romano's Star changes from about 33,000 K at minimum brightness to about 23,500 K at maximum brightness. The radius also changes from about 22.5 R_{☉} at minimum to 61 R_{☉} at maximum, so that the star is much larger and cooler when it is visually brightest. Typical behaviour for an LBV during these outbursts is for the bolometric luminosity to stay approximately constant, but Romano's Star is one of several that have been shown to significantly change their luminosity. The luminosity increases from around 500,000 L_{☉} at minimum to over a million L_{☉} at maximum.

Romano's Star is estimated to have a progenitor mass over 40 M_{☉} and to be losing mass at a rate of 1 M_{☉} every 25,000–50,000 years. The mass loss is highest when the star is largest and brightest.

== Evolution ==
Although Romano's Star has a Wolf–Rayet spectrum, it is not a classical hydrogen-free Wolf–Rayet star. It still shows about 70% more hydrogen than helium at the surface. It is estimated to be only four million years old and has not yet lost all of its outer envelope of hydrogen. Modelling the evolution of massive stars suggests that Romano's Star started as a 60 M_{☉} star, has experienced a relatively brief LBV stage after it left the main sequence, and is now losing the last of its hydrogen before becoming a more conventional Wolf–Rayet star.
