= WR 102ka =

Star in the constellation Sagittarius

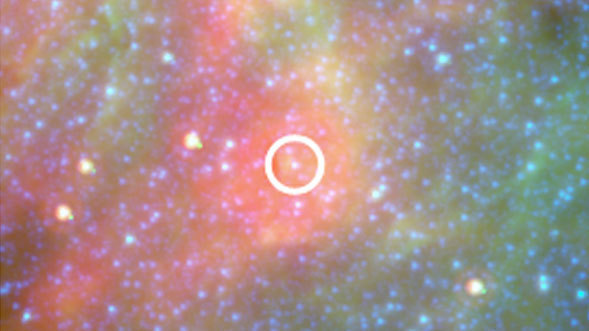
- Image of WR 102ka within Peony Nebula imaged by Spitzer Space Telescope

Observation data Epoch J2000. Equinox ICRS
- Constellation: Sagittarius
- Right ascension: 17^{h} 46^{m} 18.12^{s}
- Declination: −29° 01′ 36.5″

Characteristics
- Evolutionary stage: Slash star
- Spectral type: Ofpe/WN9
- Apparent magnitude (J): 13.0
- Apparent magnitude (H): 10.3
- Apparent magnitude (K): 8.8
- J−H color index: 2.7
- J−K color index: 4.2
- Variable type

Astrometry
| Distance | 26,000 ly (8,000 pc) |

Details
| Mass | ~100 M_{☉} |
| Radius | 97 (Note: Calculated, using the Stefan-Boltzmann law and the star's effective temperature and luminosity, with respect to the solar nominal effective temperature of 5,772 K: $$\sqrt{\biggl(\frac{5,772}{25,000}\biggr)^4 \cdot 10^{6.52}} = 97\ R_\odot.$$) R_{☉} |
| Luminosity | 3,300,000 L_{☉} |
| Temperature | 25,000 K |
| Age | ~2 Myr |

Other designations
- Peony Star, Peony nebula star, WR 102ka, 2MASS J17461811-2901366, ISOGAL-P J174618.2-290136, MSX6C G000.0003-00.1743

Database references
| SIMBAD | data |

WR 102ka, also known as the Peony Star, is a slash star that is one of several candidates for the most luminous-known star in the Milky Way.

Its name refers to the surrounding Peony Nebula, which resembles a peony flower. The name Peony Star was officially approved by the IAU Working Group on Star Names on 13 June 2026.

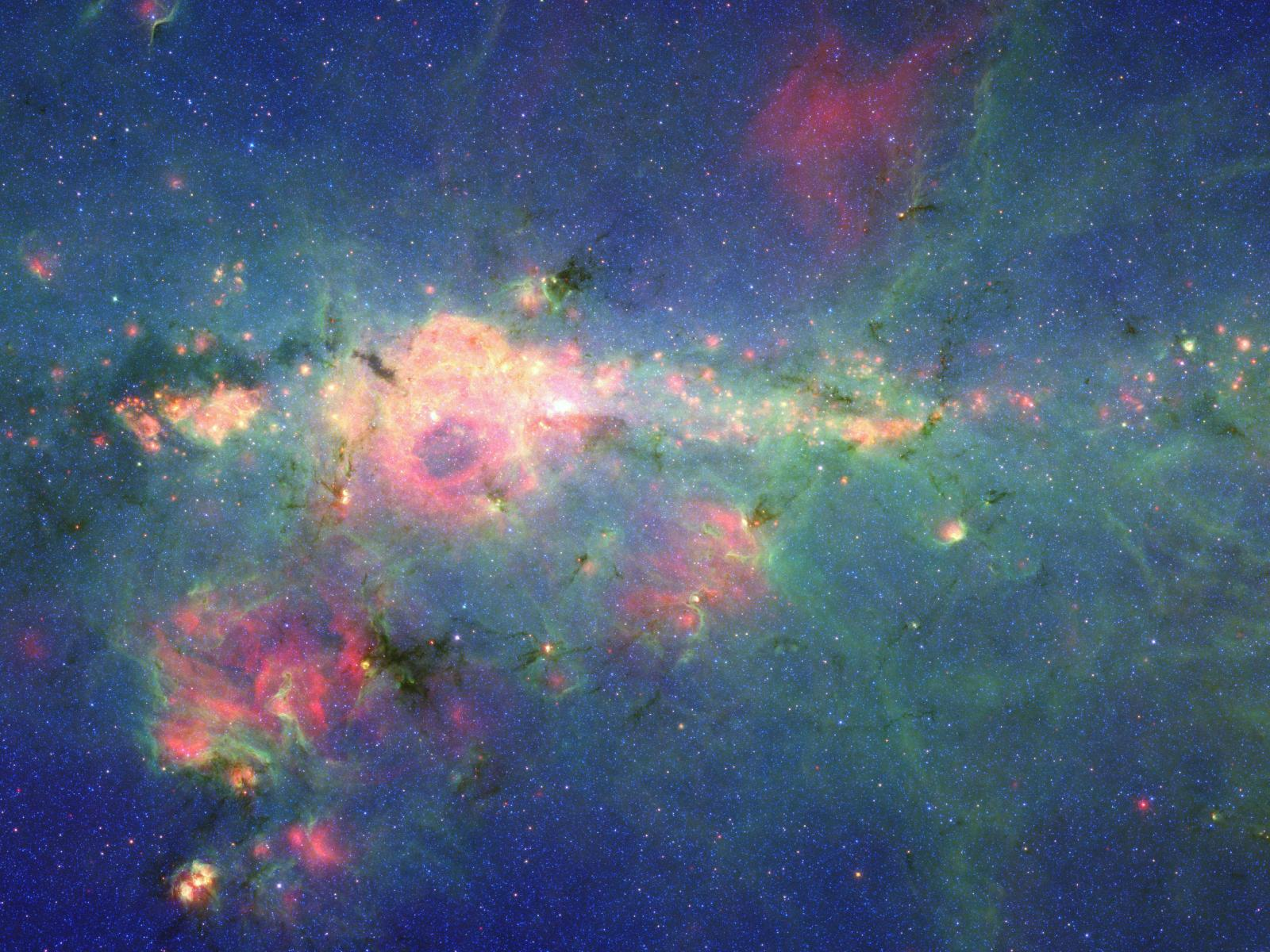
The Peony Nebula is the reddish cloud of dust in and around the white circle, surrounding the Peony Star

== Discovery ==
WR 102ka lies near the Galactic Center and is essentially totally obscured in ultraviolet wavelengths. Thus it must be observed in longer wavelength infrared light, which is able to penetrate the dust. WR 102ka was catalogued in 2002 and 2003 by infrared surveys. It was observed for the Two-Micron All Sky Survey (2MASS) in the near-infrared J, H, and K_{s} bands, at 1.2 μm, 1.58 μm, and 2.2 μm, respectively, and the ISOGAL survey of candidate young stellar objects at 7 μm and 15 μm.

Narrowband infrared observations of several spectral features around 2 μm showed that WR 102ka was a Wolf–Rayet star with a likely classification of WN10. It was also proposed as a possible luminous blue variable.

The Spitzer Space Telescope observed WR 102ka at wavelengths of 3.6 μm, 8 μm, and 24 μm on April 20, 2005. These observations allowed the first reliable calculations of the physical properties of this extremely luminous object.

== Other luminous Milky Way stars ==
The closer star WR 25 may be more luminous than WR 102ka. Another nearer star, Eta Carinae, which was the second-brightest star in the sky for a few years in the 19th century, appears to be slightly more luminous than WR 102ka, but is known to be a binary star system. There is also the more recently discovered Pistol Star that, like the Peony star, derives its name from the shape of the nebula in which it is embedded, and which it has probably created through heavy mass loss via strong stellar winds and perhaps also "mini-supernova-like" eruptions as happened to Eta Carinae around the 1830s–1840s creating the lobes observed by the Hubble Space Telescope.

The luminosities of the Pistol Star, Eta Carinae, and WR 102ka are all rendered somewhat uncertain due to heavy obscuration by galactic dust in the foreground, the effects of which must be corrected for before their apparent brightness can be reduced to estimate their total radiated power or bolometric luminosity. Both Eta Carinae and WR 102ka are believed likely to explode as supernovas or hypernovae within the next few million years. As is typical of such extremely massive and luminous stars, both have expelled a considerable portion of their initial mass, when originally formed, in dense, massive stellar winds.

== See also ==
- List of most massive stars
- List of most luminous stars
- LBV 1806-20
