= V1429 Aquilae =

Star in the constellation Aquila

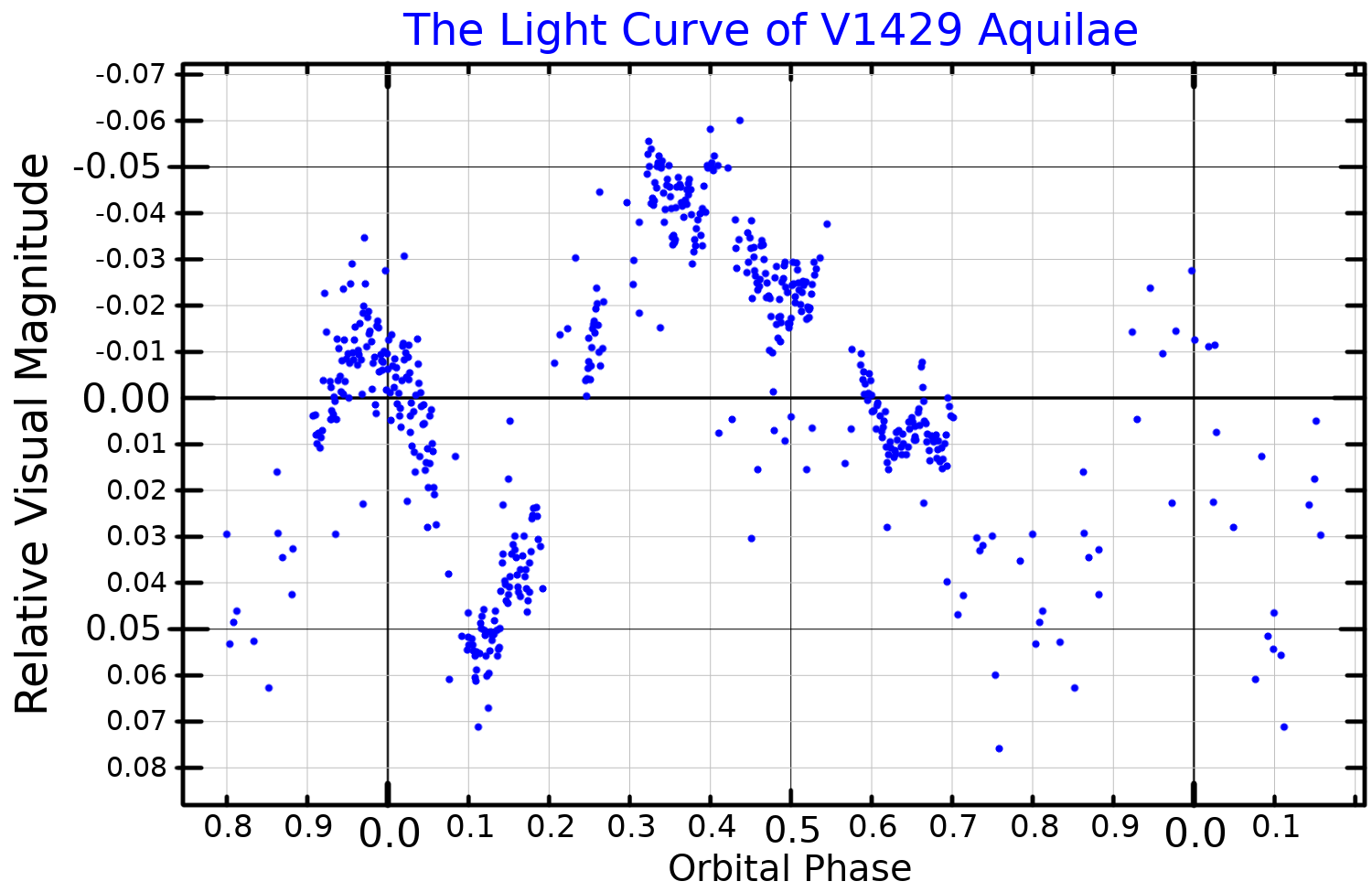
- A visual band light curve for V1429 Aquilae adapted from Richardson et al. (2016)

Observation data Epoch J2000 Equinox ICRS
- Constellation: Aquila
- Right ascension: 19^{h} 21^{m} 33.977^{s}
- Declination: +14° 52′ 56.91″
- Apparent magnitude (V): 9.79 - 10.1

Characteristics
- Spectral type: B3Ibe
- U−B color index: 0.25
- B−V color index: 1.48
- Variable type: Eclipsing + cLBV

Astrometry
Radial velocity (R_{v})	+30.7 km/s
Proper motion (μ)	RA: −2.144 mas/yr Dec.: −4.968 mas/yr
Parallax (π)	0.2224±0.0203 mas
Distance	15,000 ± 1,000 ly (4,500 ± 400 pc)
Absolute magnitude (M_{V})	−8.2

Orbit
Period (P)	60.737 ± 0.008 days
Eccentricity (e)	0.244 ± 0.020
Periastron epoch (T)	2449546.01 ± 1.10
Argument of periastron (ω) (secondary)	218.7 ± 5.7°
Semi-amplitude (K_{1}) (primary)	89.7 ± 2.0 km/s

Details

primary
Mass	39.66 M_{☉}
Radius	86.80 R_{☉}
Luminosity	710,000 L_{☉}
Surface gravity (log g)	2.26 cgs
Temperature	18,000 K
Rotational velocity (v sin i)	50 km/s

secondary
Mass	26.26 M_{☉}
Radius	20.41 R_{☉}
Surface gravity (log g)	3.55 cgs
Temperature	6,227 K
Age	6 Myr

Other designations
- V1429 Aql, BD+14°3887, MWC 314, 2MASS J19213397+1452570, WISE J192133.96+145257.0

Database references
SIMBAD	data

V1429 Aquilae is a candidate luminous blue variable multiple star system located in the constellation of Aquila. It is often referred to by its Mount Wilson Observatory catalog number as MWC 314. It is a hot luminous star with strong emission lines in its spectrum.

== Spectrum ==
V1429 Aql has a peculiar spectrum dominated by emission lines of hydrogen and many ionised metals, with Feii being particularly strong and numerous. There are also comparatively weak forbidden lines, primarily [Feii], but also [Nii]. Some absorption lines are present, but are either very weak or hidden by the emission. Many lines have variable profiles, particularly the hydrogen and helium series which vary during the orbit from emission to P Cygni profiles. The absorption lines are considered to be formed in the photosphere of the primary star, although some Feii absorption appears to be from gas between the stars. No lines of the secondary can be detected. The emission lines are formed in circumstellar material between and around the two stars Overall, the spectral type is given as B3 Ibe.

In infrared spectra, the Pfund series of lines are strongly in emission, a very unusual feature characteristic of supergiant Be stars and LBVs. V1429 Aql is given a B2:e spectral type from analysis in the infrared.

== System ==
V1429 Aquilae is a single-lined spectroscopic binary. The existence of a companion is inferred from the highly periodic variations in the radial velocity of its spectral lines and by equally periodic variations in brightness and spectral line profiles. It is unclear whether there are partial eclipses of the larger star or just of gas surrounding the stars.

The orbital period is well-defined at 60.7 days and it is moderately eccentric (0.244). The primary star fills its roche lobe for at least part of the orbit. The other characteristics of the orbit are disputed. The orbital velocity of the secondary is unknown, and the possible inclinations do not sufficiently restrict the possible models of the system. Assumptions based on broadly similar data produce wildly different results for the masses of the stars, from 5 M_{☉} to 40 M_{☉} for the primary.

A third star is visible in infrared images just over one arc second away. It is statistically likely to be in a wide orbit around the spectroscopic pair, about 5,700 AU away.

The system contains material being transferred from the primary to the secondary star as well as material surrounding both stars. A dense clump of gas near the centre of mass of the system, and co-rotating with the stars, produces the bulk of the emission lines. A more diffuse region of gas surrounds both stars and produces some absorption components in the spectrum.

The entire system is surrounded by a shell of material about 0.8 parsecs across, assuming that MWC 314 is 3,000 parsecs away. This appears in infrared images as a circular ring 25 arc-seconds from the central star. There is a much larger bipolar nebula detected by its H_{α} radiation. It is 13 parsecs from end to end.

== Variability ==
The variability of V1429 Aquilae's brightness was first reported by Anatoly S. Miroshnichenko in 1996, based on photometry undertaken from 1990 through 1995. It was given its variable star designation in 1997. V1429 Aquilae shows brightness variations of about 0.3 magnitudes and a detectable period of 4.16 days. No longterm variations in brightness have been detected over several decades of observations. The profiles of many spectral lines also vary with the same period, produced partly by radial velocity variations. The absorption and emission lines show different radial velocity amplitudes, but with the same period. Most of these variations can be accounted for by the orbit of the two stars and material being transferred from the primary to the secondary, with the gas being involved in partial eclipses, and possibly also partial eclipses of the stars themselves. The two stars are also distorted into ellipsoidal shapes by their gravity and vary in brightness as they rotate.

In addition to the orbital variations, two pulsation modes have been observed with amplitudes of a few thousandths of a magnitude and periods of 0.77 and 1.42 days.

== Physical properties ==
Estimates of the distance of V1429 Aquilae made by indirect methods range between 2.4 and 4.3 kiloparsecs (9,800-14,000 light years), with 3 kpc usually being adopted. The Gaia EDR3 parallax is 0.2224±0.0203 mas, suggesting a somewhat larger distance.

The primary is a hot B-type star. Its total luminosity has been estimated to be as much as 1,200,000 times that of the Sun (L_{☉}), with a radius 60 times larger than that of the Sun (R_{☉}), and 80 times more massive than the Sun (M_{☉}). More recent calculations give a luminosity of 710,000 L_{☉}, radius of 87 R_{☉}, and mass of 40 M_{☉}. Alternative assumptions about the orbit lead to lower values of 500,000 L_{☉}, 73 R_{☉}, and 5 M_{☉}.

The physical parameters of the star, and its spectrum, are comparable to a luminous blue variable (LBV). Although it has not shown the defining outbursts and spectral variations, the surrounding nebulae indicate episodes of heavy mass loss in the past. Alternatively, it may be a supergiant Be star.

The secondary cannot be observed. Making some assumptions, primarily the existence of a partial eclipse of the primary star, allows its mass and some physical properties to be estimated, giving a mass of 26 M_{☉} and temperature of 6,227 K, but these are speculative.

A more recent survey of LBVs put V1429 Aquilae's luminosity at a much higher 3,800,000 L_{☉}.
