= HD 37836 =

Star in Large Magellanic Cloud

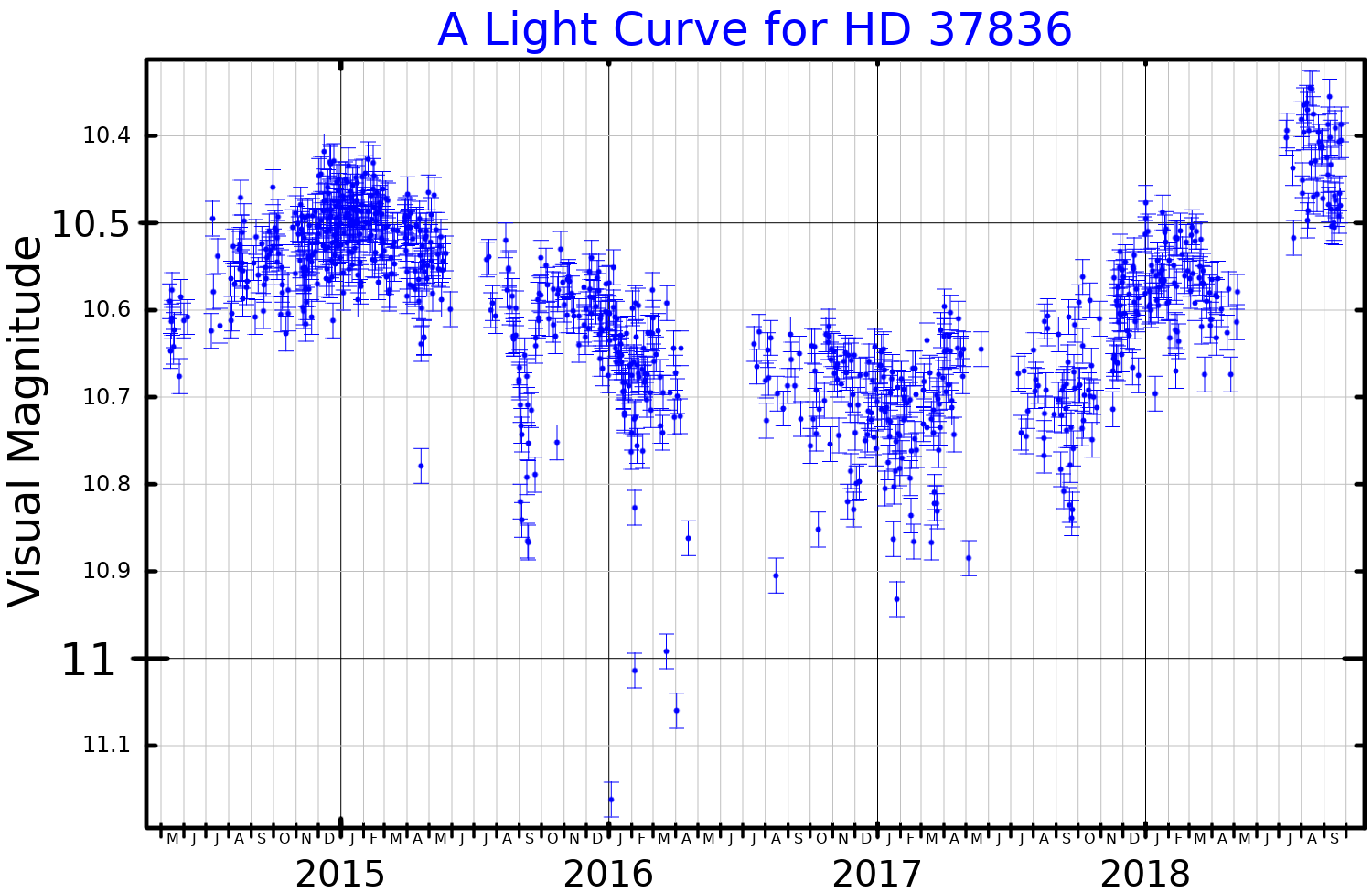
- A visual band light curve for HD 37836, plotted from ASAS-SN data

Observation data Epoch J2000 Equinox J2000
- Constellation: Dorado
- Right ascension: 05^{h} 35^{m} 16.633^{s}
- Declination: −69° 40′ 38.44″
- Apparent magnitude (V): 10.55

Characteristics
- Spectral type: B0Iae
- Apparent magnitude (U): 9.87
- Apparent magnitude (B): 10.736
- Apparent magnitude (R): 10.73
- Apparent magnitude (I): 10.164
- Apparent magnitude (J): 9.886
- Apparent magnitude (H): 9.72
- Apparent magnitude (K): 9.381
- Variable type: cLBV and α Cygni

Astrometry
Radial velocity (R_{v})	−474.41 km/s
Parallax (π)	0.0271±0.0139 mas
Distance	163,000 ly (49,970 pc)
Absolute magnitude (M_{V})	−8.5

Details
Radius	85 R_{☉}
Luminosity	4,169,000 L_{☉}
Surface gravity (log g)	2.14 cgs
Temperature	28,200 K

Other designations
- HD 37836, RMC 123, R123, HIP 26222

Database references
SIMBAD	data

HD 37836 is a candidate luminous blue variable located in the Large Magellanic Cloud and one of the brightest stars in its galaxy.

== History ==
The star was first mentioned in a 1901 paper as an object with an unusual spectrum with bright H-alpha, H-beta and H-delta lines located in the LMC. Later it was catalogued in the Henry Draper Catalogue and given the designation HD 37836. In 1957 it was noted that its spectral lines show a P Cygni profile.

== Stellar properties ==
HD 37836 is an extremely luminous blue supergiant with parameters similar to other similar stars, such as η Carinae A. It is also an α Cygni variable. Its apparent magnitude varies by ~0.2 magnitudes.

In 1983, its luminosity was estimated to be 5.6 million L_{☉} and its mass was estimated to be 100 M_{☉}, which would make it one of the most luminous and most massive known stars.

A paper published in 1987 again noted the star's peculiar spectrum. It also concluded that the star might be similar to HD 269445 and Hen S 131. The star's luminosity was estimated to be around 4 million L_{☉}.

A year later, it was classified as a possible S Doradus variable. A 1998 paper considers it an active LBV, an Alpha Cygni variable, and a 2018 census of LBVs considers it to be a candidate.

A 2023 paper estimates its luminosity to be 4.2 million solar luminosities and its temperature to be 28,200 K based on the star's spectral type, corresponding to a radius of 85 solar radii, comparable to that of Rigel.
