= AE Andromedae =

Star in the constellation Andromeda

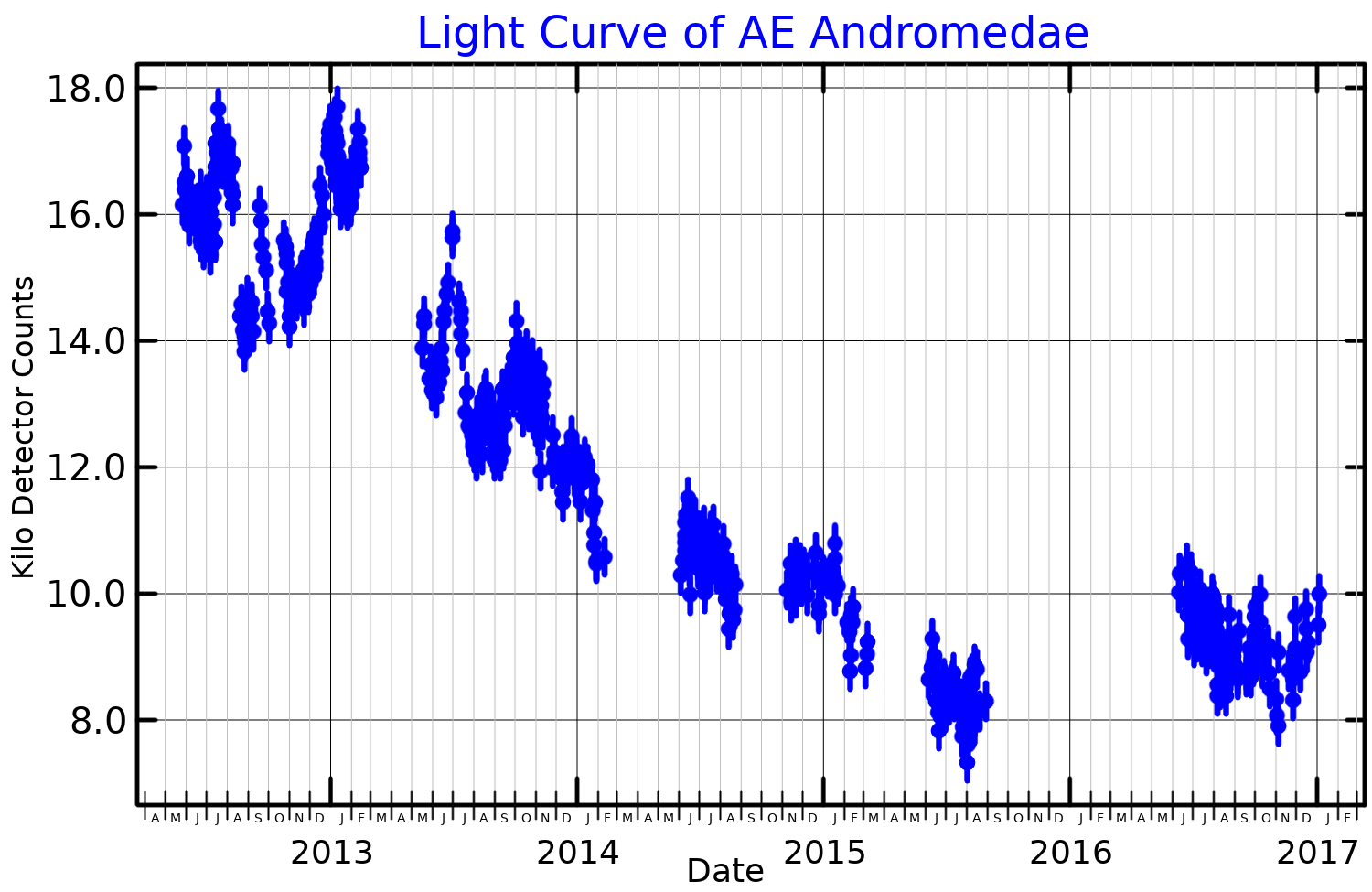
- A visual band light curve for AE Andromedae, made with the Palomar Transient Factory instrument

Observation data Epoch J2000 Equinox ICRS
- Constellation: Andromeda
- Right ascension: 00^{h} 43^{m} 02.52^{s}
- Declination: +41° 49′ 12.2″
- Apparent magnitude (V): 17.0-17.9

Characteristics
- Spectral type: LBV
- U−B color index: ~ −0.9
- B−V color index: ~ +0.1
- Variable type: LBV

Astrometry
Radial velocity (R_{v})	-193 km/s
Distance	~2.5 million ly (~780 thousand pc)
Absolute magnitude (M_{V})	−7.0 to −10.2

Details
Mass	50-120 M_{☉}
Radius	55 R_{☉}
Luminosity	450,000-700,000 L_{☉}
Temperature	20,000 K

Other designations
- AE Andromedae, AE And, HV 4476, 2MASS 00430251+4149121

Database references
SIMBAD	data

AE Andromedae (AE And) is a luminous blue variable (LBV), a type of variable star. The star is one of the most luminous variables in M31, the Andromeda Galaxy.

== Discovery ==
The star was discovered to be variable in 1928, with a photographic magnitude range of 14.7-15.6, at the Harvard College Observatory and designated HV 4476. A year later it was given the variable star designation AE Andromedae. At that time it was the brightest stellar object in M31 and maintained a similar brightness for about 20 years.

Early in the investigations leading to the definition of LBVs, AE And was identified as similar to the five Hubble–Sandage variables: Var A, Var B, Var C, and Var 2 in M33, and Var 19 in M31 (=AF Andromedae). On the basis of color–color comparisons, it was assigned as spectral type B and described as related to the P Cygni variables. Observations from 1960 to 1970 showed irregular variations in the B (blue) magnitude between 16.2 and 17.6, with very similar V magnitudes, and U magnitudes around 0.4 brighter. The first detailed spectrum was published in 1975.

== Spectrum ==
AE And is seen to have a peculiar emission line spectrum described as very much like Eta Carinae, likely due to a dense stellar wind. The spectrum in 2010 showed weaker emission lines and some weak and variable absorption lines.

AE And has prominent allowed and forbidden Fe_{II} and hydrogen lines in its emission spectrum, as well as weaker He_{I} and N_{II} lines. Some features suggest a B2-B3 spectral type but the emission and variability defy a normal classification.

The 250.7 nm Fe_{II} line is unusually strong in emission. The same feature in Eta Carinae's spectrum has been attributed to a UV laser.

== Properties ==
AE And was the brightest star in M31 when it was first noticed during an outburst, at an apparent magnitude around 15, equivalent to an absolute magnitude of −10.2, or around a million times brighter than the Sun. This implies that the outburst may have increased the luminosity of the star, which would be unusual for an LBV. The temperature at that time is not known because of a lack of spectra or multiband photometry, but a typical LBV is around 8,000K during an outburst.

Since the discovery outburst, AE And has mostly been in the quiescent, or hot, LBV phase, with small irregular brightness fluctuations. The spectrum has varied considerably even during that time, attributed to variations in the wind strength. The temperature is generally considered to be around 20,000K, consistent with a position on the S Doradus instability strip.

The star's stellar winds are strong, at 3×10^{−5} M_{☉}/yr, but slow, and have been measured on the order of 100 km/s which contributes to their optical density. There is a shell of 6×10^{−3} M_{☉} thought to have been ejected during the early 20th century outburst at a rate of at least 3×10^{−4} M_{☉}/yr.

The effective radius when quiescent has been modelled at 55 R_{☉}, based on an effective temperature of 21,000K. During an outburst, the temperature would drop and the radius increase dramatically as a pseudo-photosphere is formed due to increased mass loss.

The star's mass has not been calculated explicitly, but this type of star is massive, typically 50–120 M_{☉}.

== See also ==
- List of Andromeda's satellite galaxies
- M31-RV
