= HD 316285 =

Star in the constellation Sagittarius

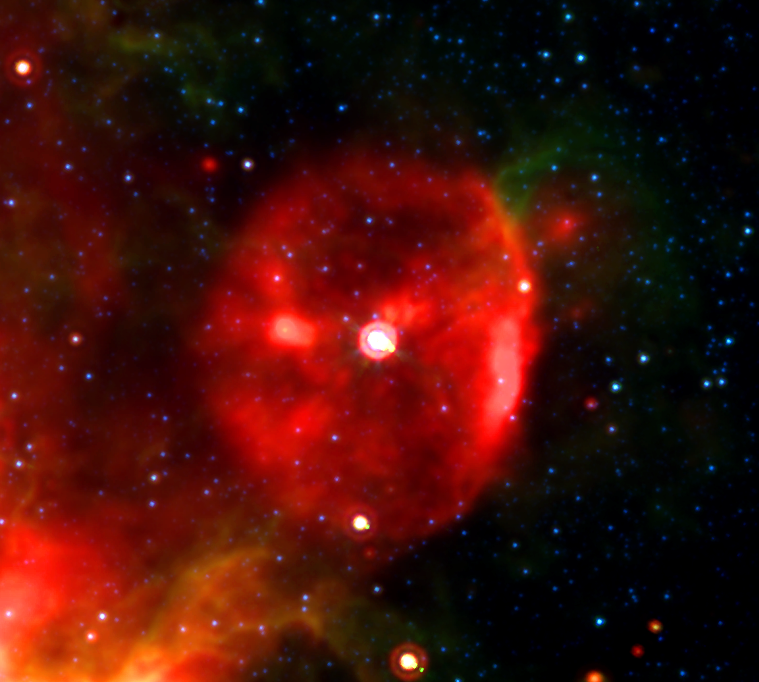
- A mid-infrared view of the shell around HD 316285; Credit: NASA Spitzer Space Telescope

Observation data Epoch J2000 Equinox ICRS
- Constellation: Sagittarius
- Right ascension: 17^{h} 48^{m} 14.03721^{s}
- Declination: −28° 00′ 53.1212″
- Apparent magnitude (V): 9.60

Characteristics
- Evolutionary stage: blue supergiant
- Spectral type: B0Ieq
- U−B color index: +0.61
- B−V color index: +1.67
- Variable type: cLBV

Astrometry
Proper motion (μ)	RA: −2.155 mas/yr Dec.: −4.556 mas/yr
Parallax (π)	0.3010±0.0294 mas
Distance	1,900 pc
Absolute magnitude (M_{V})	−8.4

Details
Mass	18.6 M_{☉}
Radius	75 R_{☉}
Luminosity	275,000 L_{☉}
Surface gravity (log g)	0.74 cgs
Temperature	15,000 K
Metallicity [Fe/H]	−0.49 dex

Other designations
- V4375 Sagittarii, HD 316285, HIP 87136, CD −27°11944, SAO 185776, GCRV 67373, MWC 272, AAVSO 1741-27B

Database references
SIMBAD	data

HD 316285 is a blue supergiant star in the constellation Sagittarius. It is a candidate luminous blue variable and lies about 6,000 light years away in the direction of the Galactic Center. Its designation is a catalogue number from the Henry Draper Extension, and so it is sometimes referred to as HDE 316825.

== Discovery ==
HD 316285 was identified in 1925 as an unusual star having P Cygni lines in its spectrum, lines with both emission and absorption components offset by a doppler shift. It was classified as a Be star although it is now known to be a supergiant and the class of Be stars excludes supergiants, and was included in the Mount Wilson Observatory catalogue of B and A stars with bright lines of hydrogen (MWC) as entry 272. In 1956, it was reported that the emission was due to an expanding atmosphere rather than the circumstellar discs of less evolved Be stars. In 1972 it was discovered to have an infrared excess, an unusually high emission at infrared wavelengths due to surrounding warm dust.

In 1961, HD 316285 was catalogued as planetary nebula Bl3-11, although that classification was quickly cast into doubt.

== Variability ==
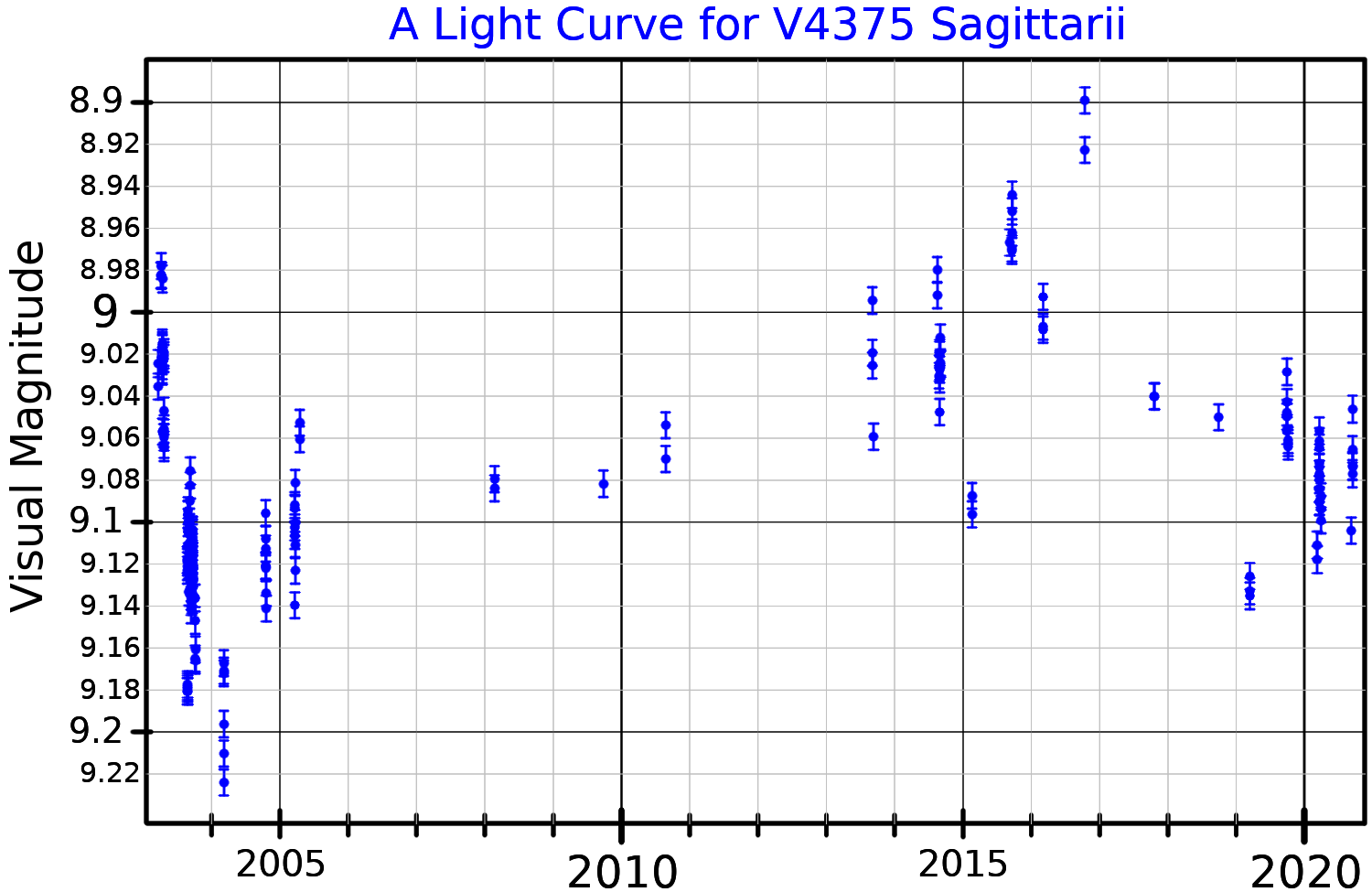
A visual band light curve for V4375 Sagittarii, plotted from INTEGRAL Optical Monitoring Camera data

HD 316285 was found to be a variable star in 1996, when the Hipparcos data was analysed. It was given its variable star designation, V4375 Sagittarii, in 1999. HD 316285 is listed in the General Catalogue of Variable Stars as a variable Be star with a range of about one tenth of a magnitude. The International Variable Star Index classifies it as an S Doradus variable and it is considered to be a candidate luminous blue variable.

== Properties ==
The spectrum shows that HD 316285 has only 1.5 times as much hydrogen as helium and elevated levels of carbon, nitrogen, and oxygen, so it can be identified as a highly evolved star. It has been calculated to be losing mass at the rate of M_{☉} every four thousand years via its stellar wind.

Gaia astrometry suggests a distance much larger than the accepted 1.9kpc, and would imply a much higher luminosity. It may even lie close to the Galactic Center.

HD 316285 has been identified as a possible type II-b or type IIn supernova candidate in modelling of the fate of stars 20 to 25 times the mass of the Sun. It has been shown that these supernovae may explode directly from stars in an LBV phase after spending time as a red supergiant.

A possible companion has been reported on the basis of a helical outflow of material apparently originating from HD 316285. This would be caused by a jet being twisted into a spiral shape by orbital motion.
