= SN 2010jl =

Type IIn supernova discovered in 2010

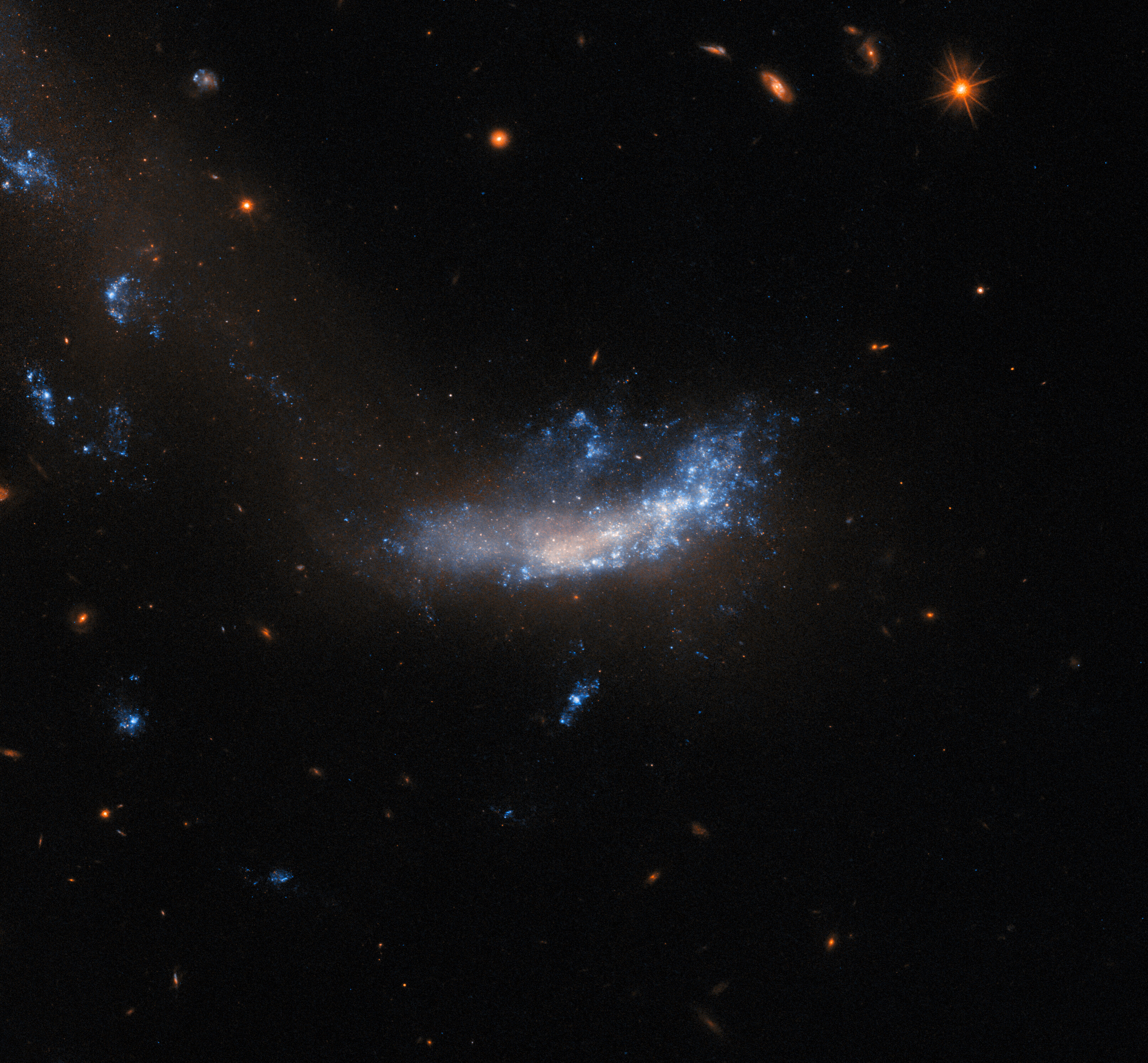
- Image of the host UGC 5189A
- Event type: Supernova
- Type IIn
- Date: detected 3 November 2010 by the Puckett Observatory
- Constellation: Leo
- Distance: 150 million ly
- Host: UGC 5189A
- Other designations: SN 2010jl
- Related media on Commons

SN 2010jl was a luminous Type IIn supernova that was discovered on 3 November 2010, in the irregular galaxy UGC 5189A. It is located around 150 million light-years (48.9±3.4 Mpc) away from the Solar System. It showed an infrared excess which lasted for almost 13 years.

== Discovery ==
2010jl was discovered during the Puckett Observatory Supernova Search, by Newton & Puckett with a 40 cm reflector at Portal, Arizona. The discovery was made on Nov. 3.52 UT and was confirmed on Nov. 4.50. Follow-up spectroscopy showed broad emission and narrow-line emission from hydrogen and helium leading to a classification of Type IIn.

== Infrared excess ==
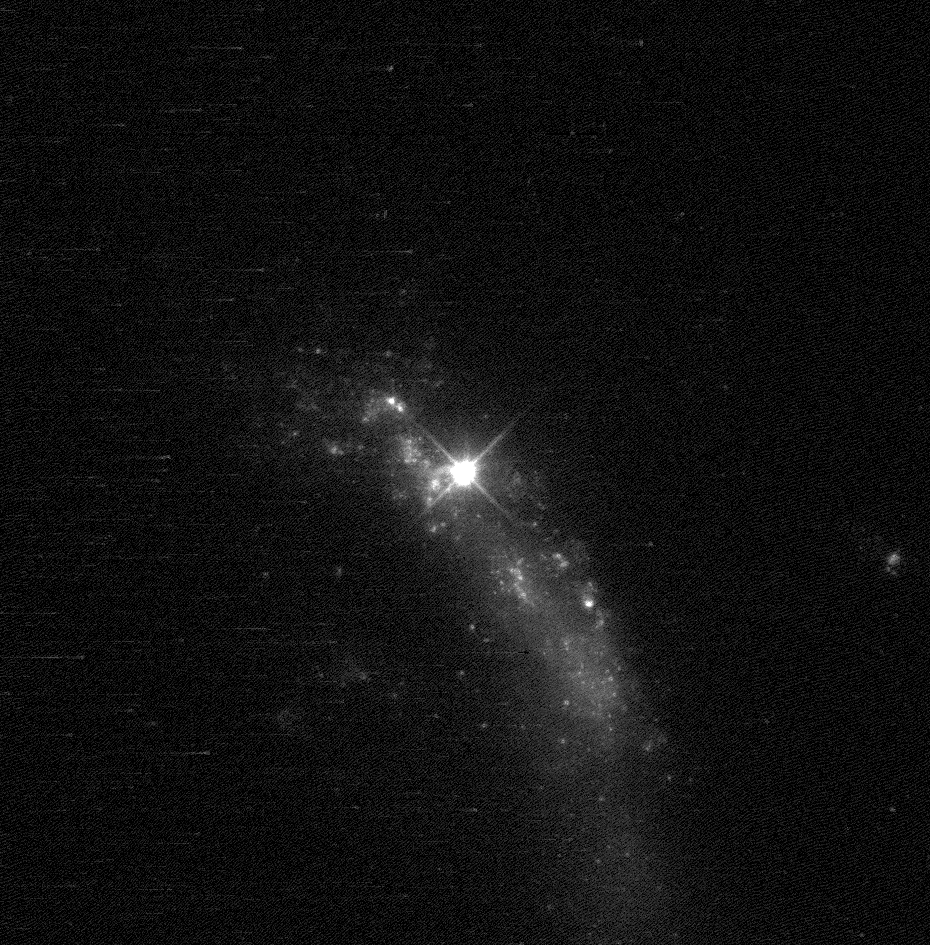
SN 2010jl with Hubble STIS on 23 January 2011

=== CSM interaction ===
The classification as Type IIn showed that the supernova was interacting with the circumstellar medium (CSM). The supernova itself produces the broad emission, the flash-ionized circumstellar medium produces on the other hand the Type IIn typical narrow-line emission features. Observations with Chandra-ACIS X-ray showed absorption features caused by circumstellar matter. At the time of the observation it was one of the most luminous supernovae observed in X-rays.

=== Infrared echo ===
Observations with the Hubble Space Telescope detected near-infrared excess that lasted for 400 days. While the early near-infrared detection is dominated by the supernova, the later near-infrared detection becomes more dominated by the infrared echo. The echo is caused by pre-existing circumstellar dust that does not interact with the supernova, but that scatters the light of the supernova.

=== New dust ===
A later study with Gemini and Spitzer showed that infrared excess persisted until the end of the observations on day 1367 after the discovery. This very late detection of infrared excess cannot be explained with an infrared echo alone. Between days 260 and 464 the near-infrared jumps in brightness and then slowly fades until day 1,000. The jump in near-infrared brightness is explained with the formation of new dust.

The formation of new dust can be shown by several other features. 2010jl showed on the one hand infrared excess caused by thermal radiation of the newly formed dust. It also showed blueshift of the emission-lines, which is caused by the dust blocking the material that is further away from our line of sight. A third line of evidence is increased fading in the optical, which could not be shown due to lacking observations in a specific timespan. It was determined that the supernova produced about 0.005-0.01 M_{☉} (about 5-10 Jupiter masses) of predominantly carbon dust grains by the day 1400. Observations with the James Webb Space Telescope MIRI spectroscopy did find that the supernova has produced a total dust mass of at least 0.11 to 0.3 M_{☉}, almost 13 years after the explosion. It is among the largest dust masses for any type IIn seen so far. Researchers estimate 2010jl might produce another 1 M_{☉} within another decade.

== 2010jl-like supernovae ==
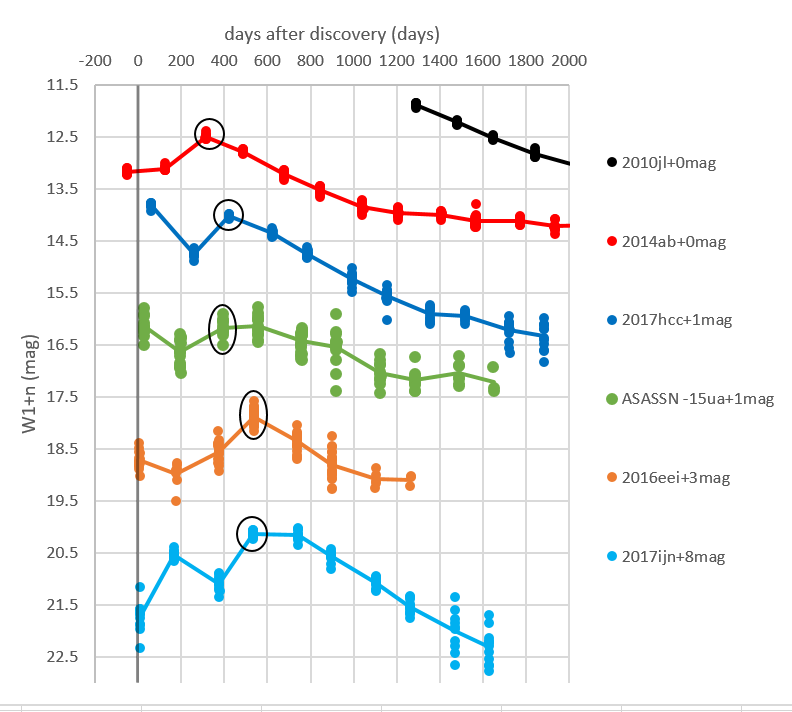
Type II supernovae that have similar mid-infrared light curves when compared to 2010jl. The second brightening is marked with a black circle. Data is from NEOWISE.

Following the discovery of 2010jl, several other Type IIn supernovae with long-lasting infrared excess were discovered. Their H- and K-band and mid-infrared light curve is dominated by two increases of the brightness. The first increase appears during the discovery and is attributed to the CSM interaction and the light echo. The second increase is attributed to the formation of new dust. After the second increase the infrared light curve shows a fading.

The following 2010jl-like supernovae are known: SN 2014ab, SN 2015da and SN 2017hcc. The supernova ASASSN-15ua is also mentioned to be similar to 2010jl. Additionally there are Type II supernovae with mid-infrared light curves that are similar to 2010jl.
