= AG Carinae =

Luminous variable star in the constellation Carina

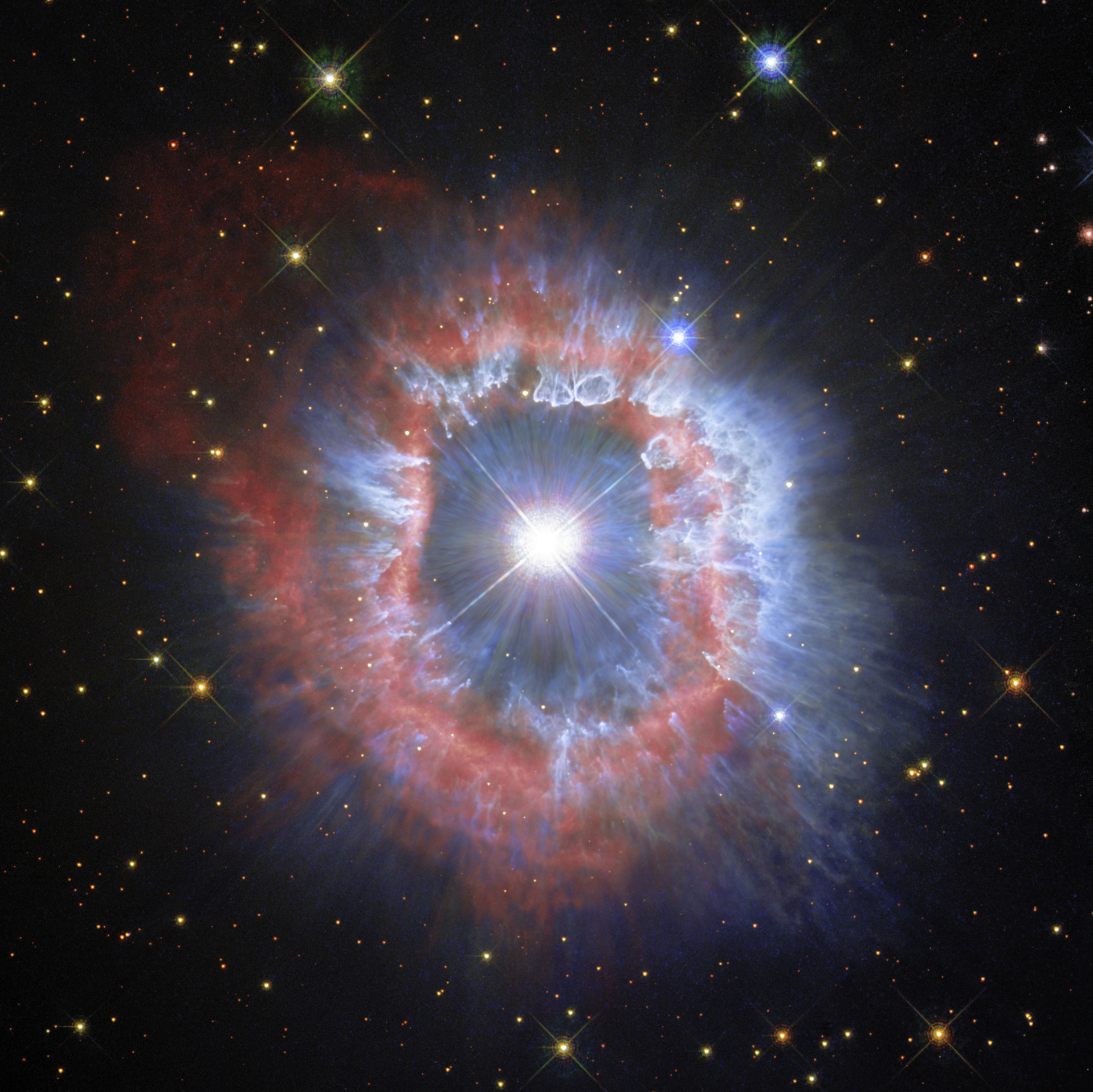
- AG Carinae (Hubble Space Telescope image)

Observation data Epoch J2000 Equinox ICRS
- Constellation: Carina
- Right ascension: 10^{h} 56^{m} 11.57814^{s}
- Declination: −60° 27′ 12.8107″
- Apparent magnitude (V): 5.7–9.0

Characteristics
- Spectral type: LBV
- U−B color index: −0.58
- B−V color index: +0.61
- Variable type: LBV

Astrometry
Proper motion (μ)	RA: −4.808 mas/yr Dec.: +1.955 mas/yr
Parallax (π)	0.1925±0.0165 mas
Distance	17,000 ± 1,000 ly (5,200 ± 400 pc)
Absolute magnitude (M_{V})	~−8 (at minimum)

Details
Mass	55 M_{☉}
Radius	50–595+78 −44 R_{☉}
Luminosity	630,000–1,580,000 L_{☉}
Temperature	7,500–24,000 K
Rotation	13±2 days
Rotational velocity (v sin i)	220±50 km/s

Other designations
- WR 31b, AG Car, AAVSO 1052–69, CD−59°3430, CPD−59°2860, HD 94910, HIP 53461, SAO 251185

Database references
SIMBAD	data

AG Carinae (AG Car) is a star in the constellation of Carina. It is classified as a luminous blue variable (LBV) and is one of the most luminous stars in the Milky Way. The great distance (20,000 light-years) and intervening dust mean that the star is not usually visible to the naked eye; its apparent brightness varies erratically between magnitude 5.7 and 9.0.

In 1914, Harry Edwin Wood announced his discovery that this star, then called CPD−59°2860, is a variable star, based on photographic plates taken in 1911 and 1914. It was given its variable star designation, AG Carinae, in 1921.

== Description ==
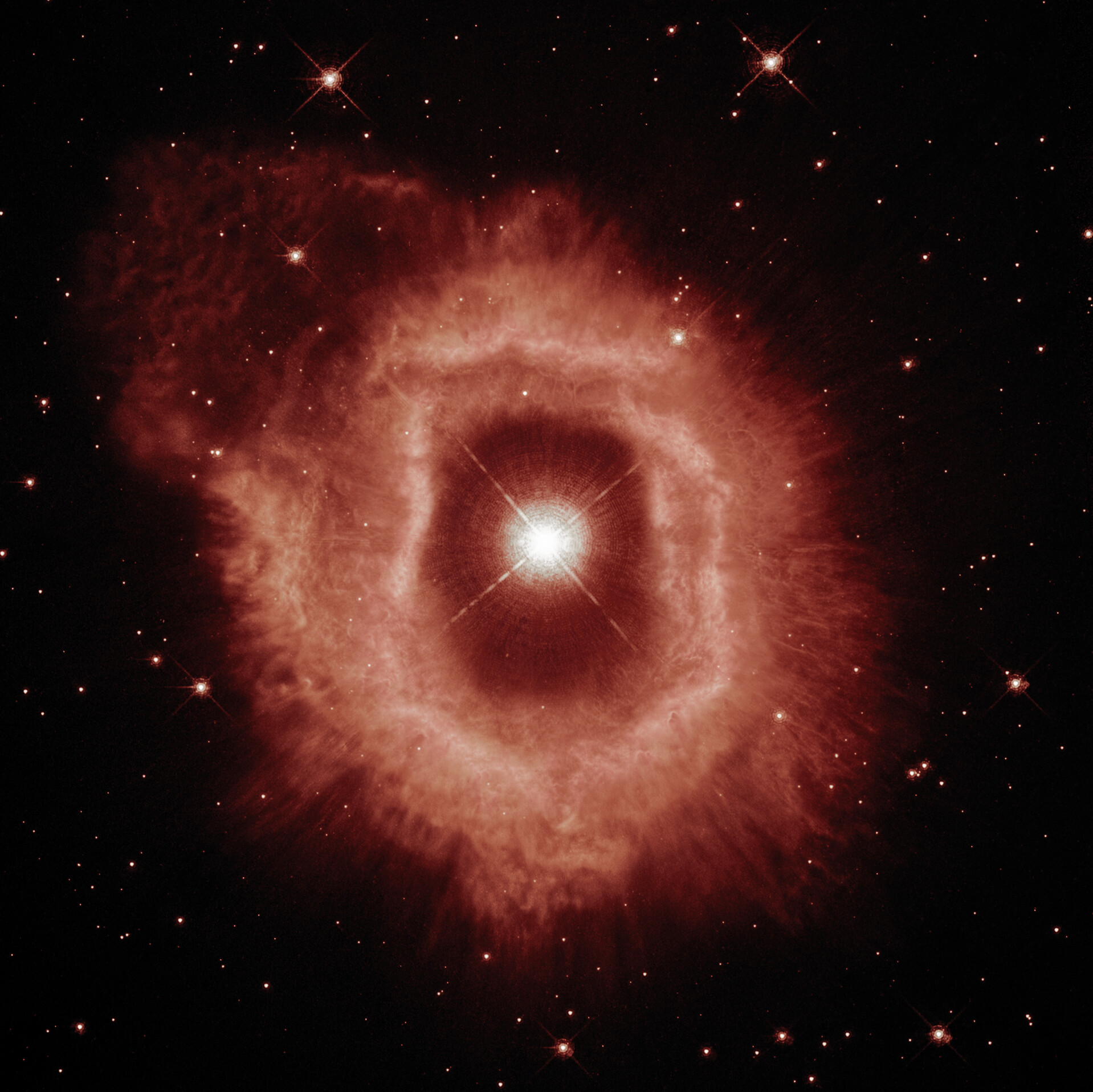
This image showcases the details of the ionised hydrogen and ionised nitrogen emissions from the nebula (seen here in red).

The star is surrounded by a nebula of ejected material at 0.4–1.2 pc from the star. The nebula contains around 15 M_{☉}, all lost from the star around 10,000 years ago. There is an 8.8-parsec-wide empty cavity in the interstellar medium around the star, presumably cleared by fast winds earlier in the star's life.

AG Carinae is apparently in a transitional phase between a massive class O blue supergiant and a Wolf–Rayet star, where it is highly unstable and suffers from erratic pulsations, occasional larger outbursts, and rare massive eruptions. The spectral type varies between WN11 at visual minimum and an early A hypergiant at maximum. At visual minimum the star is about 65 R_{☉} and 20,000–24,000 K, while at maximum it is over 400 R_{☉} and 8,000 K. The temperature varies at different minima.

One study calculated that the bolometric luminosity of AG Carinae decreases during its S Doradus-type outbursts, unlike most LBVs which remain at approximately constant luminosity. The luminosity drops from around 1.5 million L_{☉} at visual minimum to around 1 million L_{☉} at visual maximum, possibly due to the energy required to expand a considerable fraction of the star.

Evolutionary models of the star suggest that it had a low rotation rate for much of its life, but current observations show fairly rapid rotation.

Models of LBV progenitors of type IIb supernovae list AG Carinae as matching the final stellar spectrum prior to core collapse, although the models are for stars with 20 to 25 times the mass of the Sun while AG Carinae is thought to be considerably more massive. The initial mass of the star would have been around 100 M_{☉} and is now thought to be 55–70 M_{☉}.

== Distance controversy ==
Parallaxes from data release 1 (DR1) of the Gaia mission suggest a much closer distance to AG Carinae and its neighbour Hen 3-519 than previously accepted, around 2,000 parsecs. Then both stars would be less luminous than LBVs and it is argued that they would be former red supergiants whose unusual characteristics are the result of binary evolution.

The earlier Hipparcos parallax for AG Carinae had a margin of error larger than the parallax itself and so gave little information about its distance. The distance of 6,000 parsecs is based on assumptions about the properties of LBVs, models of interstellar extinction, and kinematical measurements. The Gaia DR1 parallax, derived from the combination of the first year of Gaia measurements with Tycho astrometry, is 0.40±0.22 mas. The Gaia team recommend that a further 0.3 mas systematic error is allowed for (i.e. added to the formal margin of error). A 2017 study argues that the 0.3 mas systematic margin of error can be ignored and that the implied distance to AG Carinae is 2.50±1.41 kpc.

In Gaia Data Release 2, the parallax is 0.1532±0.0291 mas, suggesting a distance around 6,500 pc. A 2019 observation yields a most likely distance of 4,650 pc. Gaia Early Data Release 3 gives a parallax of 0.1925±0.0165 mas, although with a non-trivial level of excess astrometric noise where there was none in Gaia DR2.

== Light curve ==
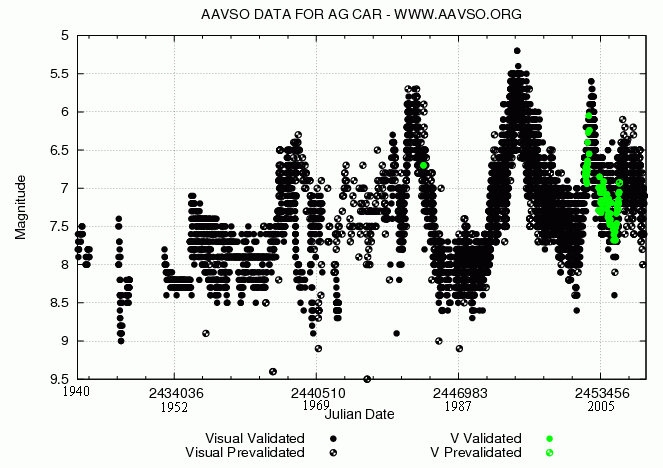
AAVSO light curve of luminous blue variable AG Car from 1 Jan 1940 to 23 Nov 2010. Up is brighter and down is fainter.
