= April 2015 lunar eclipse =

Total lunar eclipse of 4 April 2015

- Total eclipse
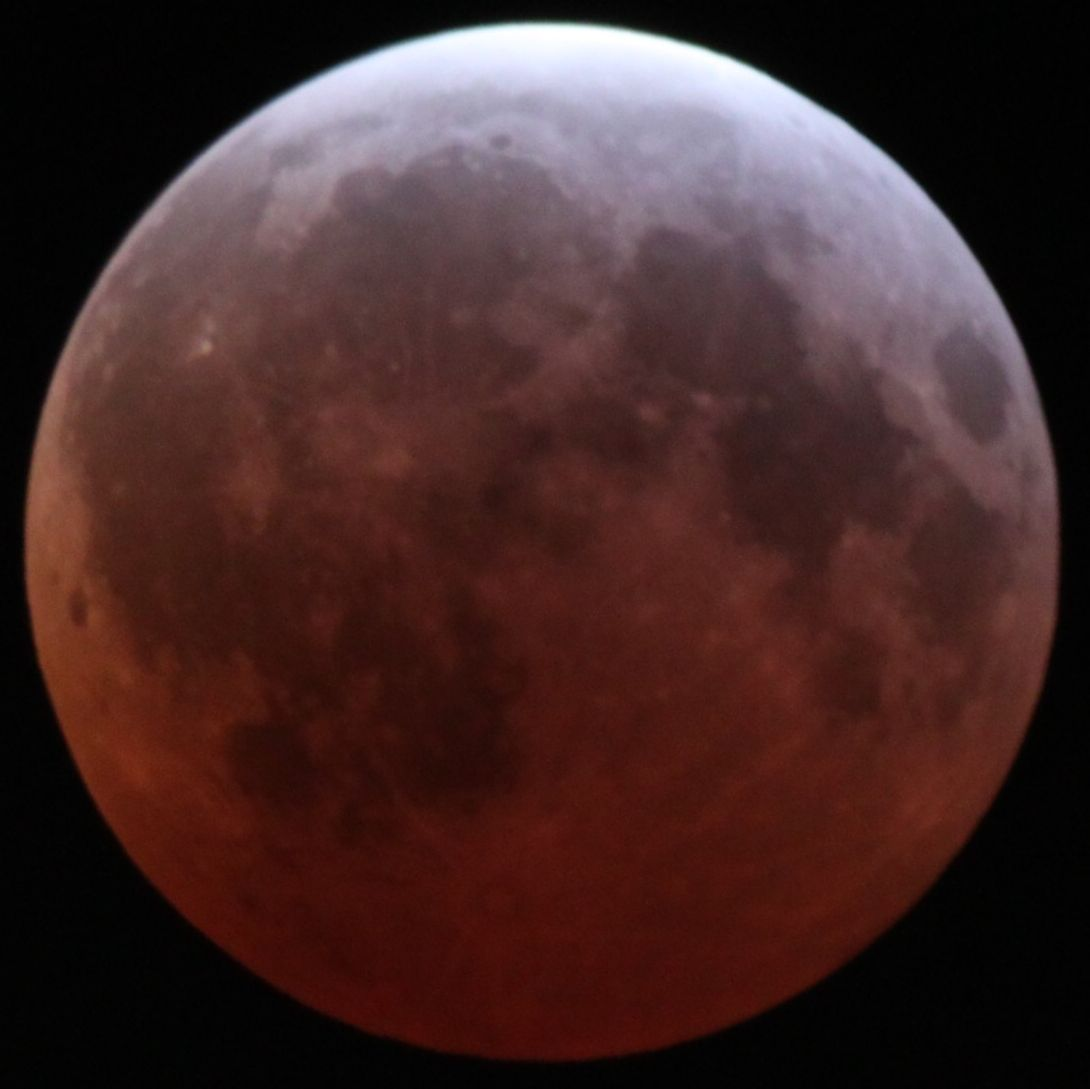
- Totality as viewed from Los Angeles, California, 12:00 UTC
- Date: April 4, 2015
- Gamma: 0.4460
- Magnitude: 1.0019
- Saros cycle: 132 (30 of 71)
- Totality: 4 minutes, 43 seconds
- Partiality: 209 minutes, 1 second
- Penumbral: 357 minutes, 31 seconds
Contacts (UTC)
- P1: 09:01:27
- U1: 10:15:45
- U2: 11:57:54
- Greatest: 12:00:15
- U3: 12:02:37
- U4: 13:44:46
- P4: 14:58:58

A total lunar eclipse occurred at the Moon’s ascending node of orbit on Saturday, April 4, 2015, with an umbral magnitude of 1.0019. A lunar eclipse occurs when the Moon moves into the Earth's shadow, causing the Moon to be darkened. A total lunar eclipse occurs when the Moon's near side entirely passes into the Earth's umbral shadow. Unlike a solar eclipse, which can only be viewed from a relatively small area of the world, a lunar eclipse may be viewed from anywhere on the night side of Earth. A total lunar eclipse can last up to nearly two hours, while a total solar eclipse lasts only a few minutes at any given place, because the Moon's shadow is smaller. Occurring about 3.1 days after apogee (on April 1, 2015, at 9:00 UTC), the Moon's apparent diameter was smaller.

This lunar eclipse is the third of a tetrad, with four total lunar eclipses in series, the others being on April 15, 2014; October 8, 2014; and September 28, 2015.

This is the 30th member of Lunar Saros 132, and the first total eclipse of the series. The previous event was the March 1997 lunar eclipse, being slightly partial.

It occurred on Easter Sunday (Gregorian only).

== Duration ==
Totality lasted only 4 minutes and 43 seconds, making it the shortest lunar totality in almost five centuries since October 17, 1529 (which lasted 1 minute and 42 seconds). It was claimed by some that due to the oblateness of the Earth, it may have actually just been a partial eclipse. It was the sixth total lunar eclipse out of nine with totality under 5 minutes in a five millennium period between 2,000 BC and 3,000 AD. The eclipsed moon was 12.9% smaller in apparent diameter than the supermoon September 2015 lunar eclipse, measured as 29.66' and 33.47' in diameter from the center of the Earth. It occurred 3 days past apogee at 29.42'.

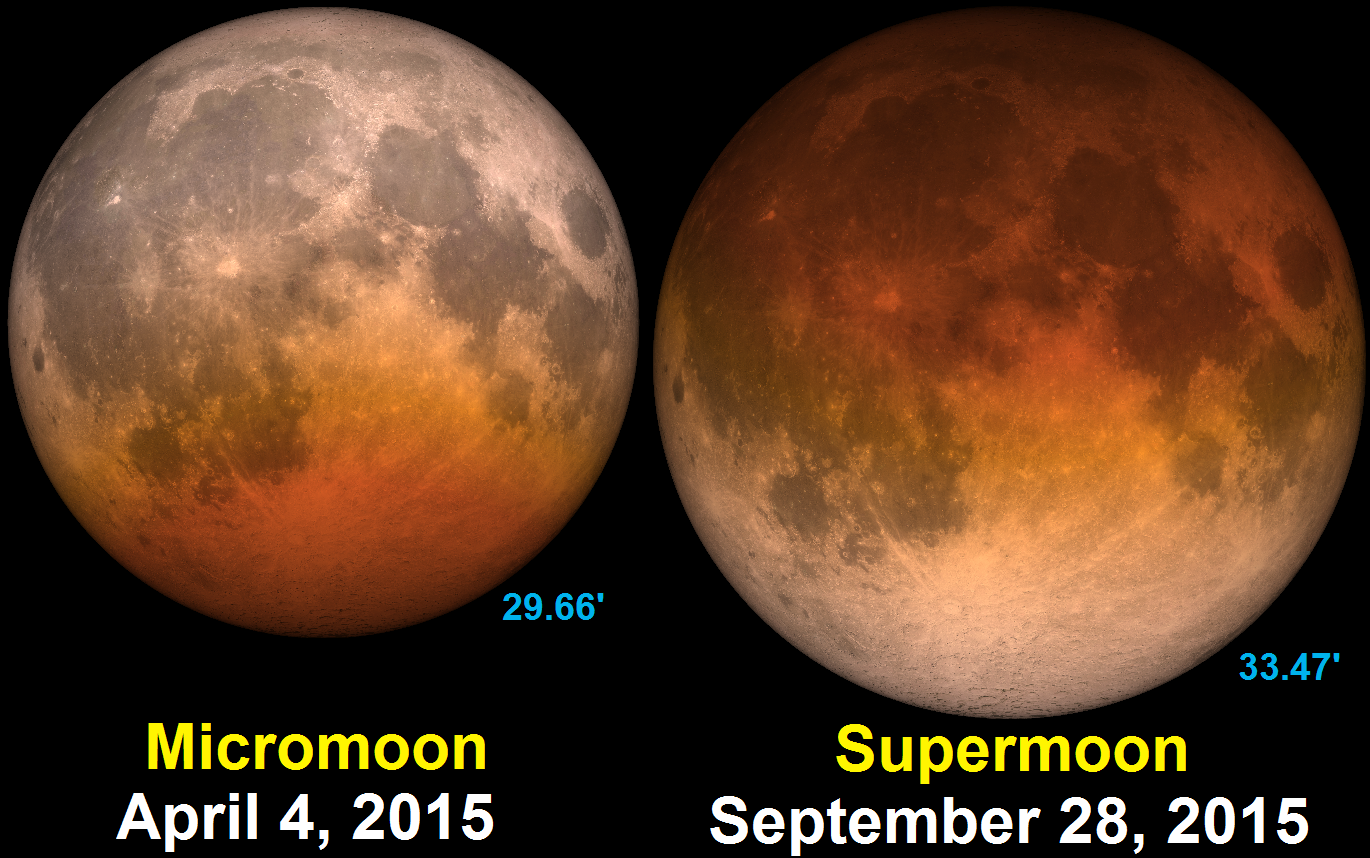

== Background ==
A lunar eclipse occurs when the Moon passes within Earth's umbra (shadow). As the eclipse begins, Earth's shadow first darkens the Moon slightly. Then, the shadow begins to "cover" part of the Moon, turning it a dark red-brown color (typically - the color can vary based on atmospheric conditions). The Moon appears to be reddish because of Rayleigh scattering (the same effect that causes sunsets to appear reddish) and the refraction of that light by Earth's atmosphere into its umbra.

The following simulation shows the approximate appearance of the Moon passing through Earth's shadow. The Moon's brightness is exaggerated within the umbral shadow. The southern portion of the Moon will be closest to the center of the shadow, making it darkest, and most red in appearance.

== Visibility ==
The eclipse was completely visible over northeast Asia, eastern Australia, the Pacific Ocean, and western North America, seen rising over Asia and western Australia and setting over North and South America.

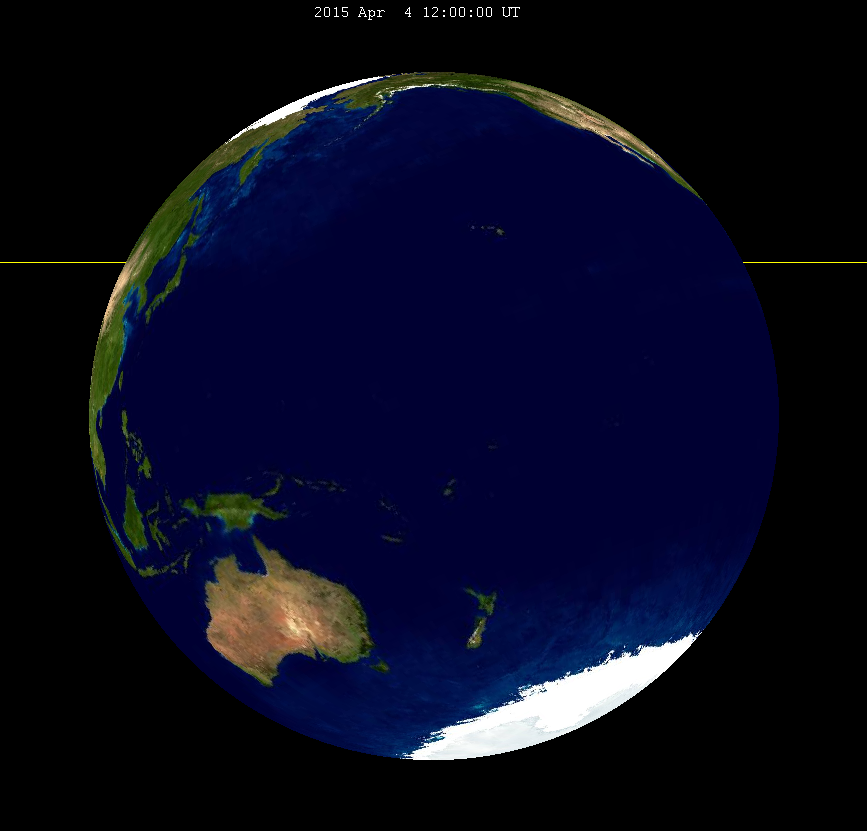
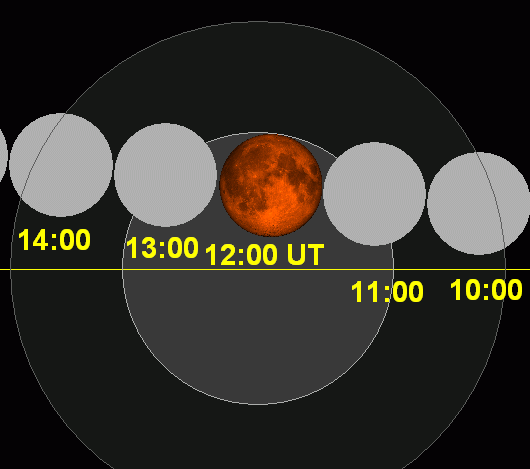
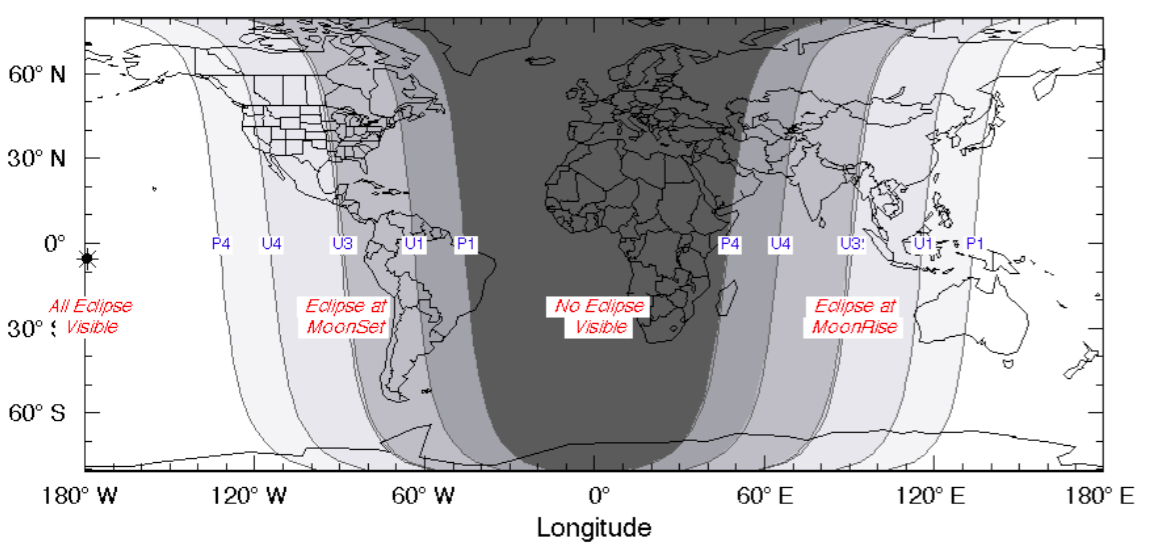
Visibility map

== Timing ==
Local times of contacts
| Time Zone adjustments from UTC | | +8_{h} | +11_{h} | +13_{h} | -10_{h} | -8_{h} | -7_{h} | -6_{h} | -5_{h} | -4_{h} |
| Time Zone adjustments from UTC | | AWST | AEDT | NZDT | HST | AKDT | PDT | MDT | CDT | EDT |
|---|---|---|---|---|---|---|---|---|---|---|
| Event | | Evening April 4 | | | Morning April 4 | | | | | |
| P1 | Penumbral begins | N/A† | 8:01 pm | 10:01 pm | 11:01 pm | 1:01 am | 2:01 am | 3:01 am | 4:01 am | 5:01 am |
| U1 | Partial begins | 6:16 pm | 9:16 pm | 11:16 pm | 12:16 am | 2:16 am | 3:16 am | 4:16 am | 5:16 am | 6:16 am |
| U2 | Total begins | 7:58 pm | 10:58 pm | 12:58 am | 1:58 am | 3:58 am | 4:58 am | 5:58 am | 6:58 am | Set |
| | Greatest eclipse | 8:00 pm | 11:00 pm | 1:00 am | 2:00 am | 4:00 am | 5:00 am | 6:00 am | 7:00 am | Set |
| U3 | Total ends | 8:03 pm | 11:03 pm | 1:03 am | 2:03 am | 4:03 am | 5:03 am | 6:03 am | Set | Set |
| U4 | Partial ends | 9:45 pm | 12:45 am | 2:45 am | 3:45 am | 5:45 am | Set | Set | Set | Set |
| P4 | Penumbral ends | 10:59 pm | 1:59 am | 3:59 am | 3:59 am | 5:59 am | Set | Set | Set | Set |

† The Moon was not visible during this part of the eclipse in this time zone.

Contact points relative to the Earth's umbral and penumbral shadows, here with the Moon near its descending node.

The timing of total lunar eclipses are determined by its contacts:
- P1 (First contact): Beginning of the penumbral eclipse. Earth's penumbra touches the Moon's outer limb.
- U1 (Second contact): Beginning of the partial eclipse. Earth's umbra touches the Moon's outer limb.
- U2 (Third contact): Beginning of the total eclipse. The Moon's surface is entirely within Earth's umbra.
- Greatest eclipse: The peak stage of the total eclipse. The Moon is at its closest to the center of Earth's umbra.
- U3 (Fourth contact): End of the total eclipse. The Moon's outer limb exits Earth's umbra.
- U4 (Fifth contact): End of the partial eclipse. Earth's umbra leaves the Moon's surface.
- P4 (Sixth contact): End of the penumbral eclipse. Earth's penumbra no longer makes contact with the Moon.

== Gallery ==
Progression from Bali, Indonesia
| Time-lapsed image from Taiwan | Sequence from Fox Observatory in Sunrise, Florida |
| Sequence from Melbourne, Florida | Progression from St. Louis, Missouri |

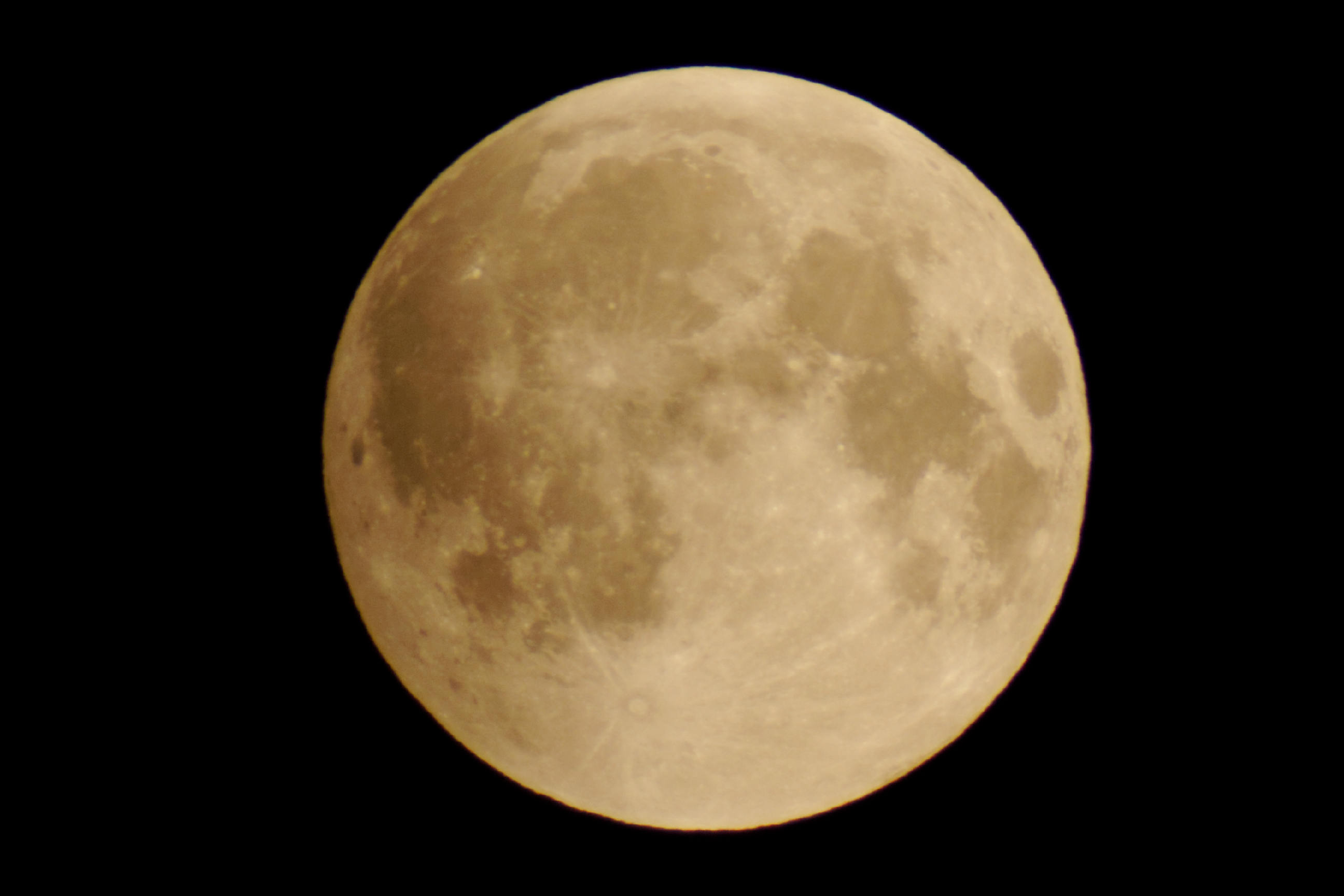
Toronto, Canada, 9:54 UTC

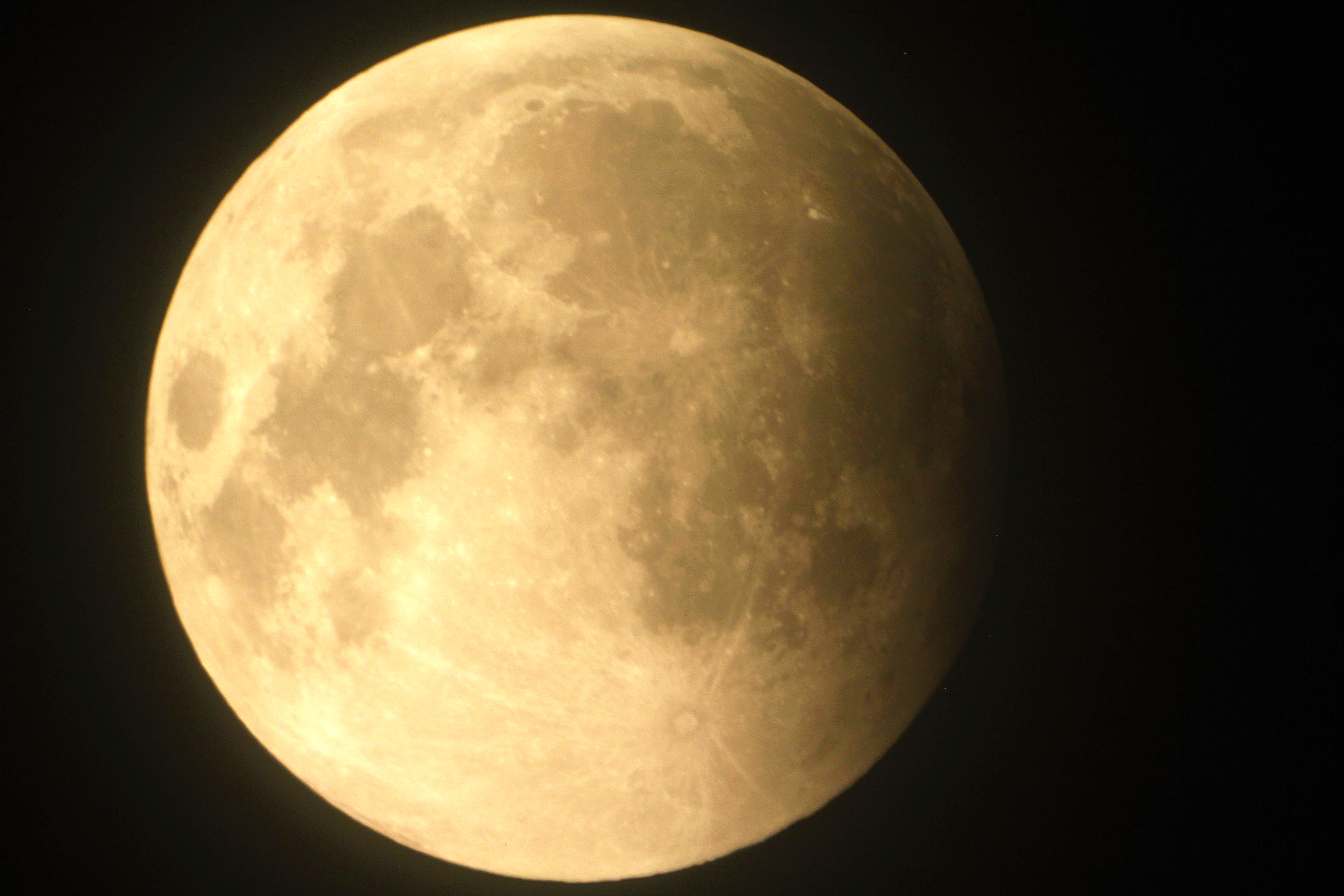
Auckland, New Zealand, 9:54 UTC

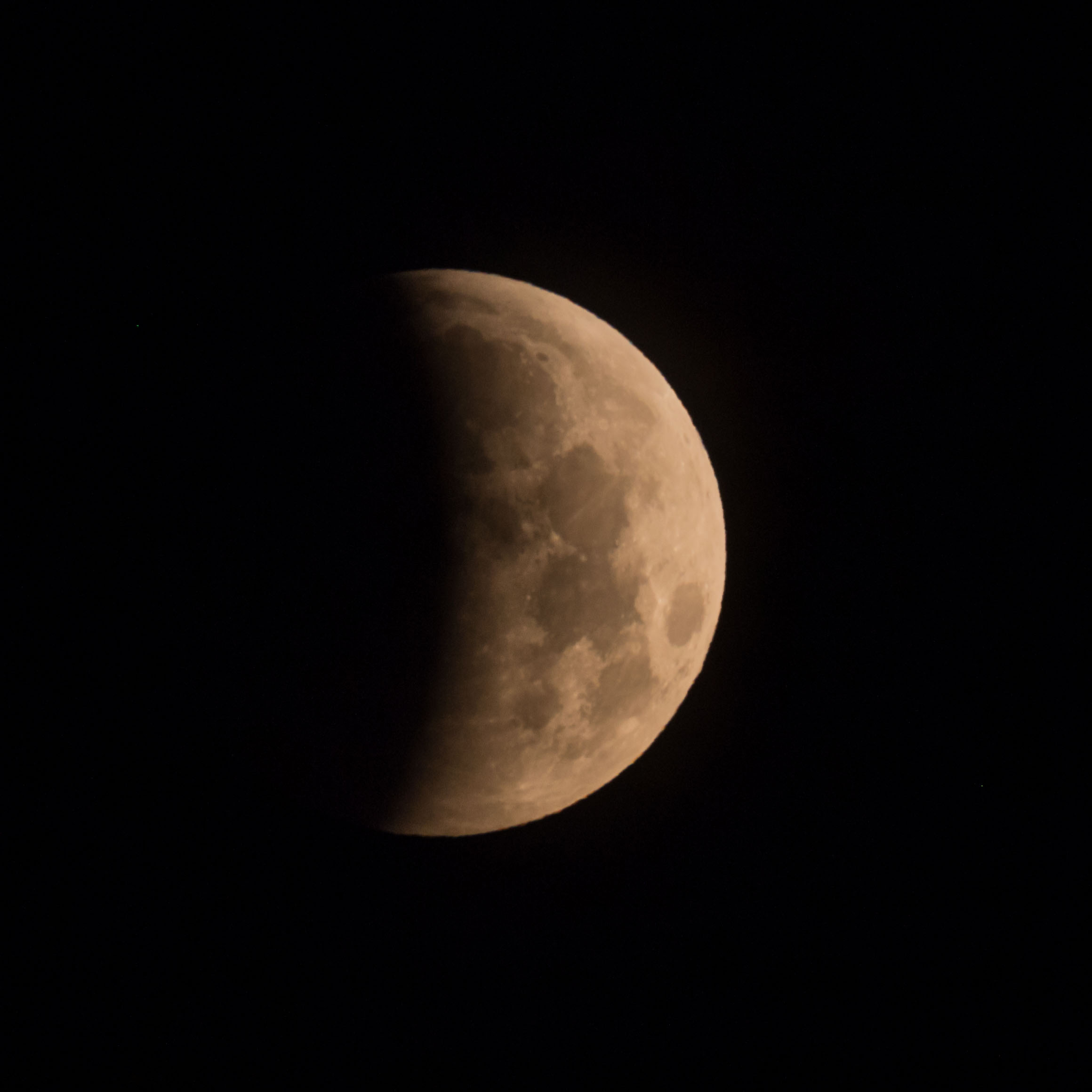
Macon, Georgia, 10:54 UTC

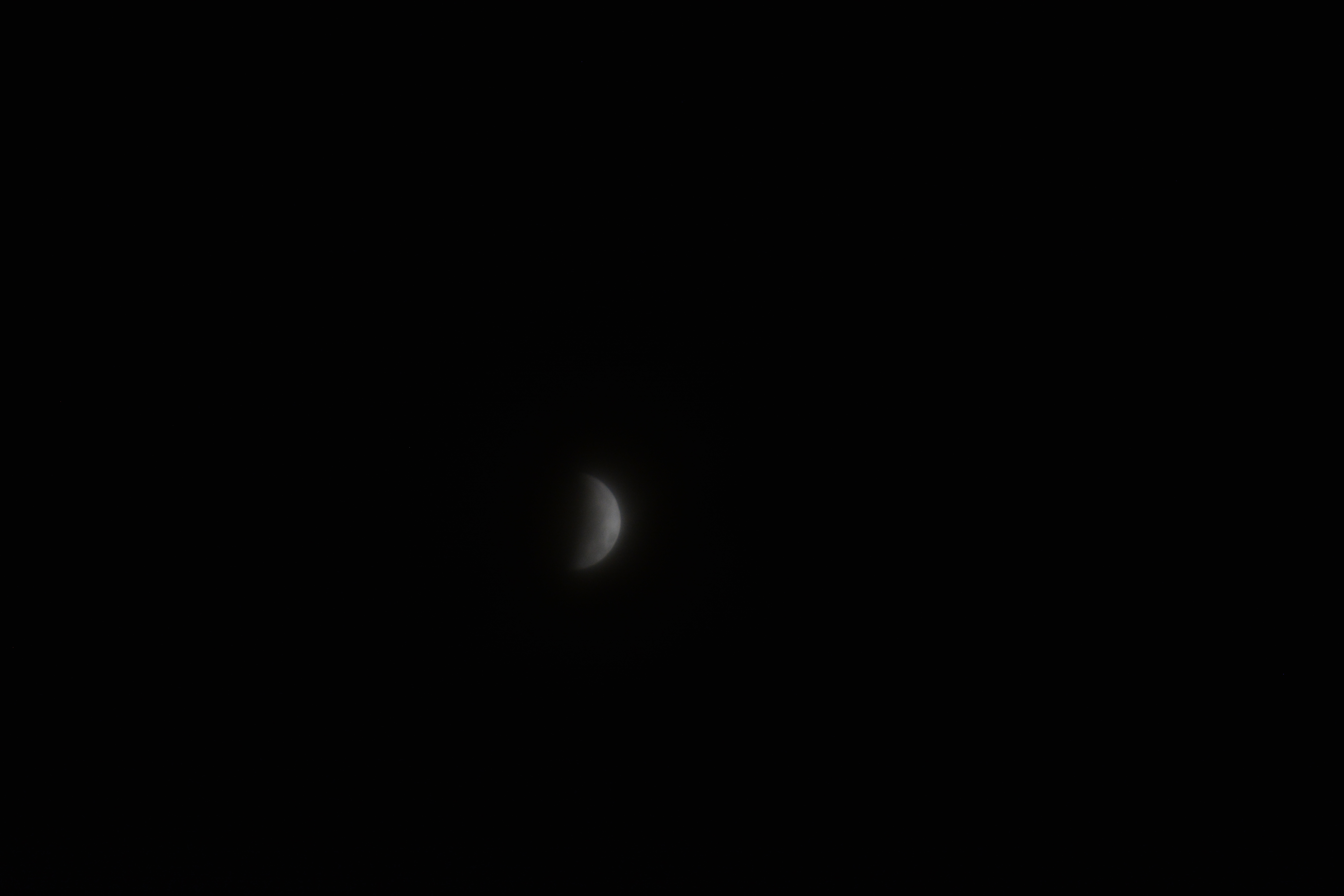
Mexico City, Mexico, 10:59 UTC

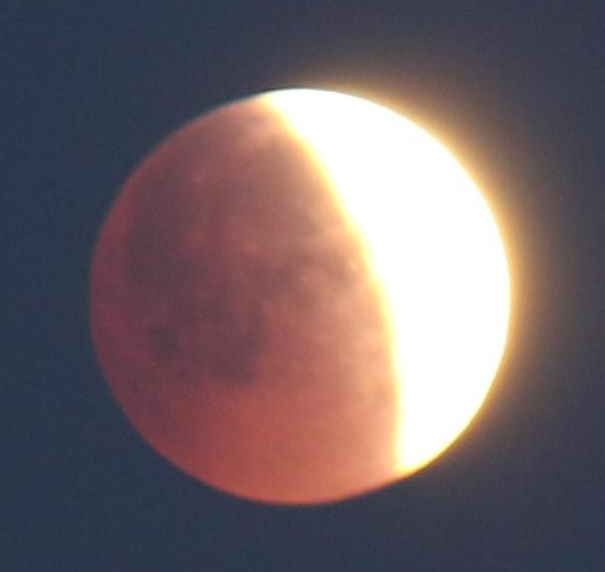
Minneapolis, Minnesota, 11:09 UTC

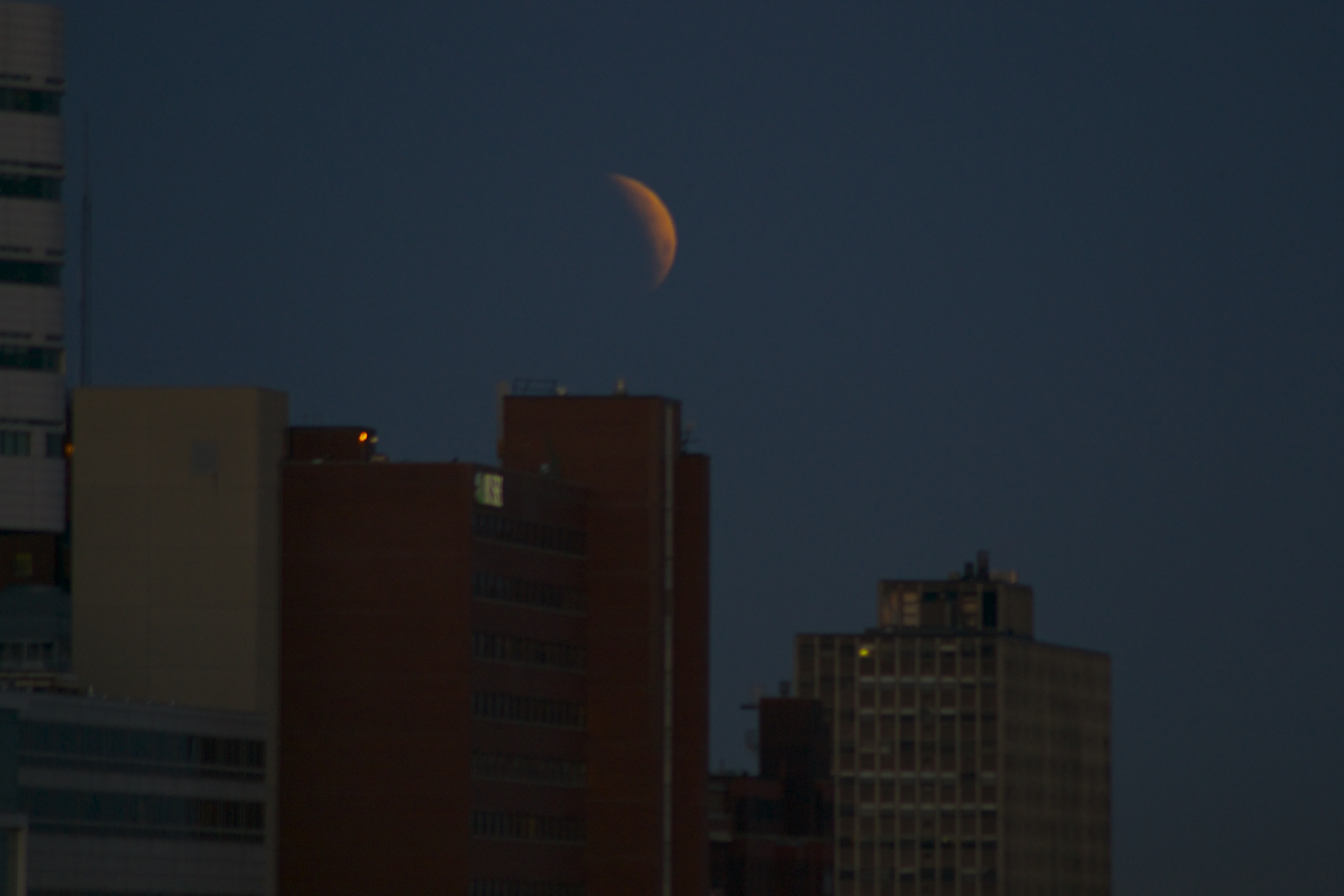
Chicago, Illinois, 11:36 UTC

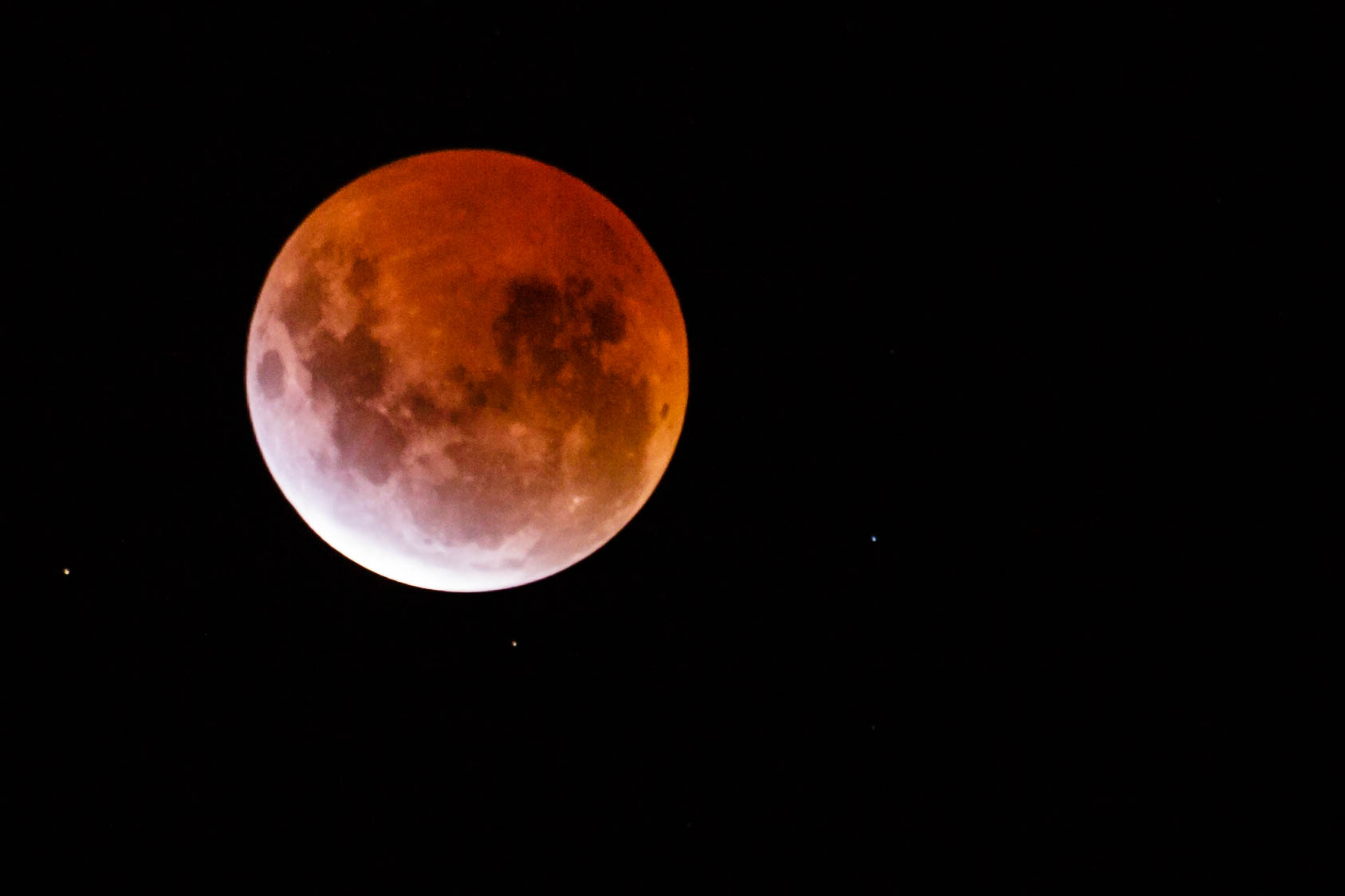
Melbourne, Australia, 11:46 UTC

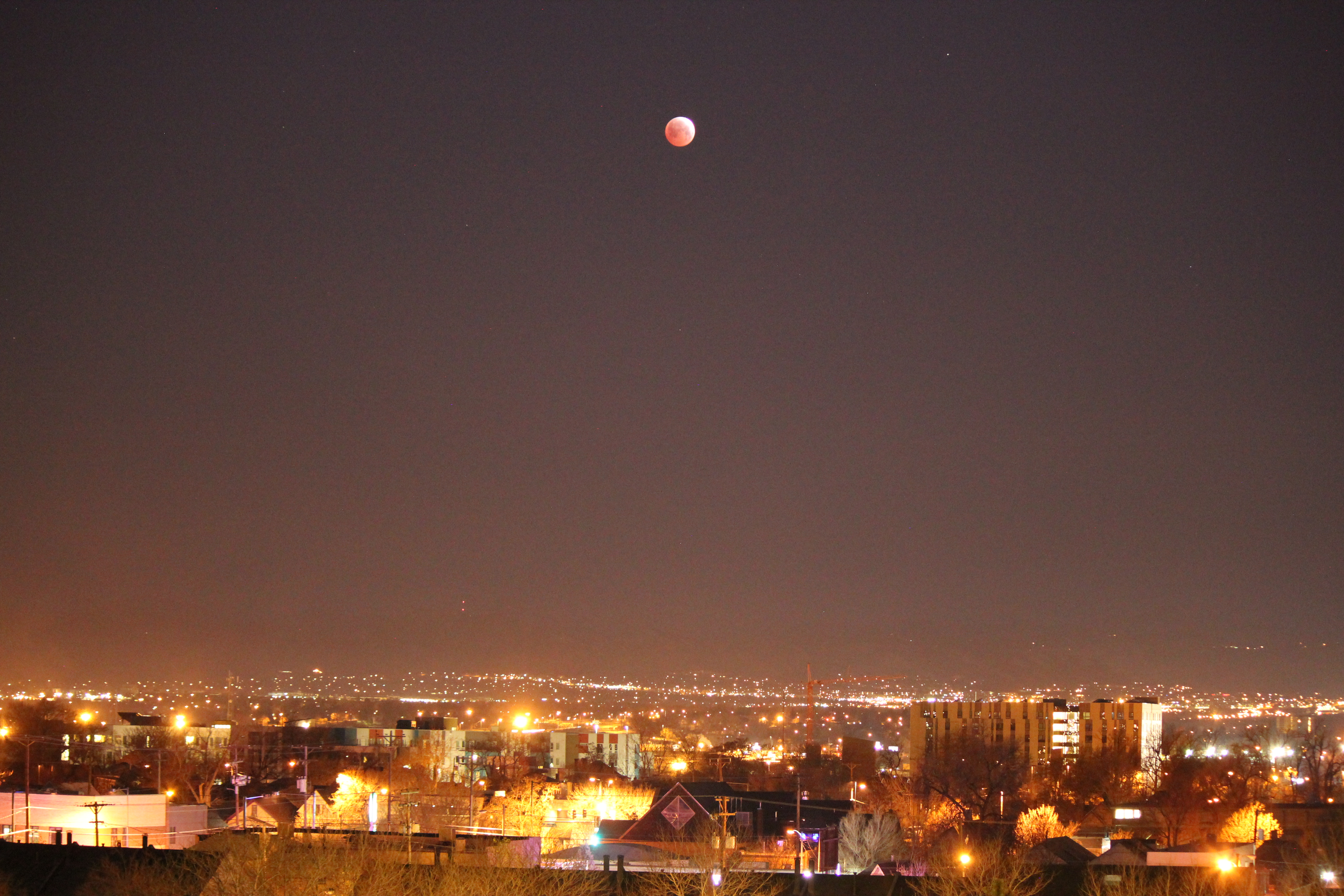
Denver, Colorado, 11:50 UTC

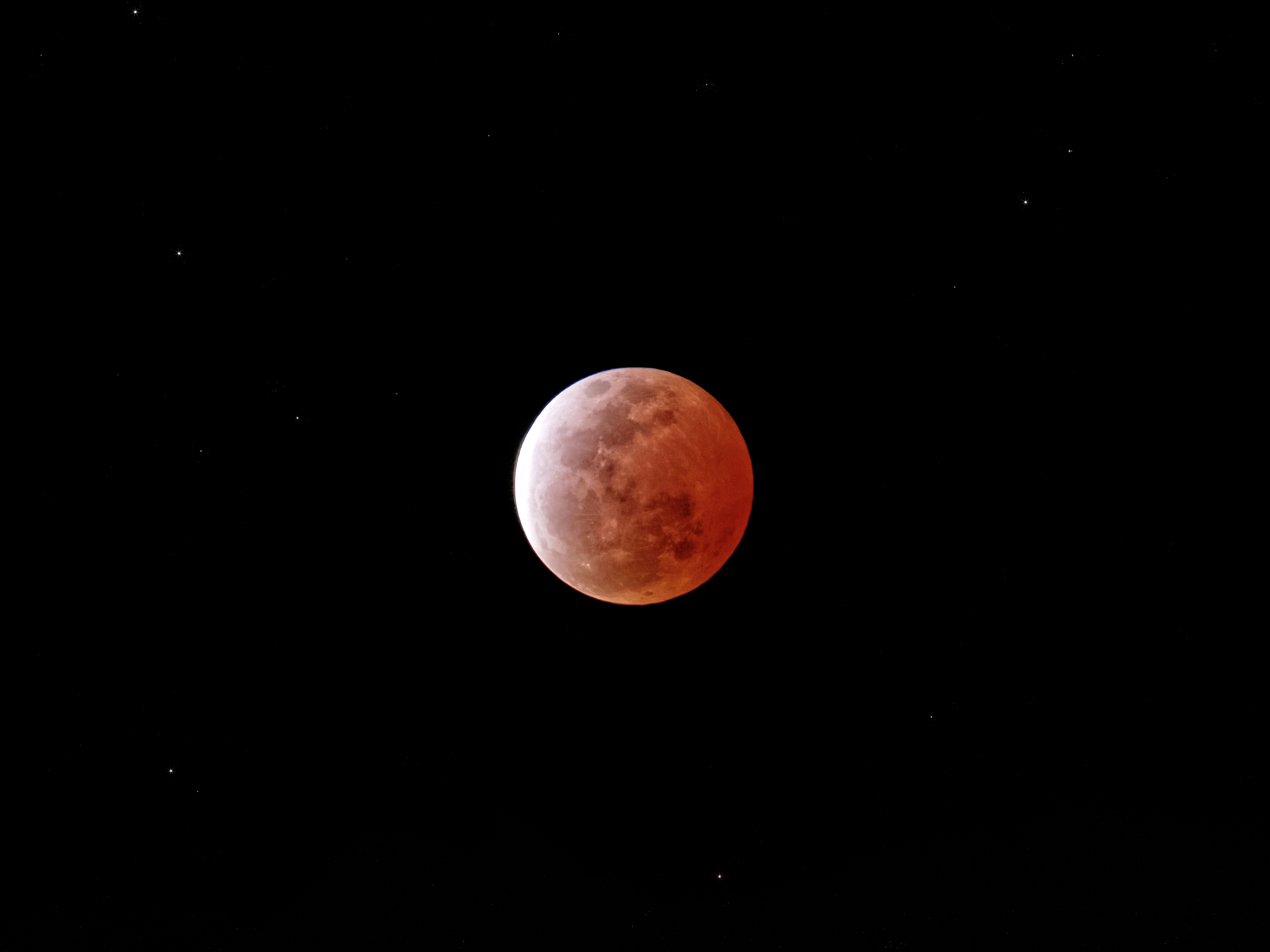
Tai Po, Hong Kong, 12:01 UTC

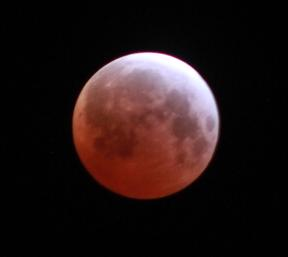
Santa Clara County, California, 12:02 UTC

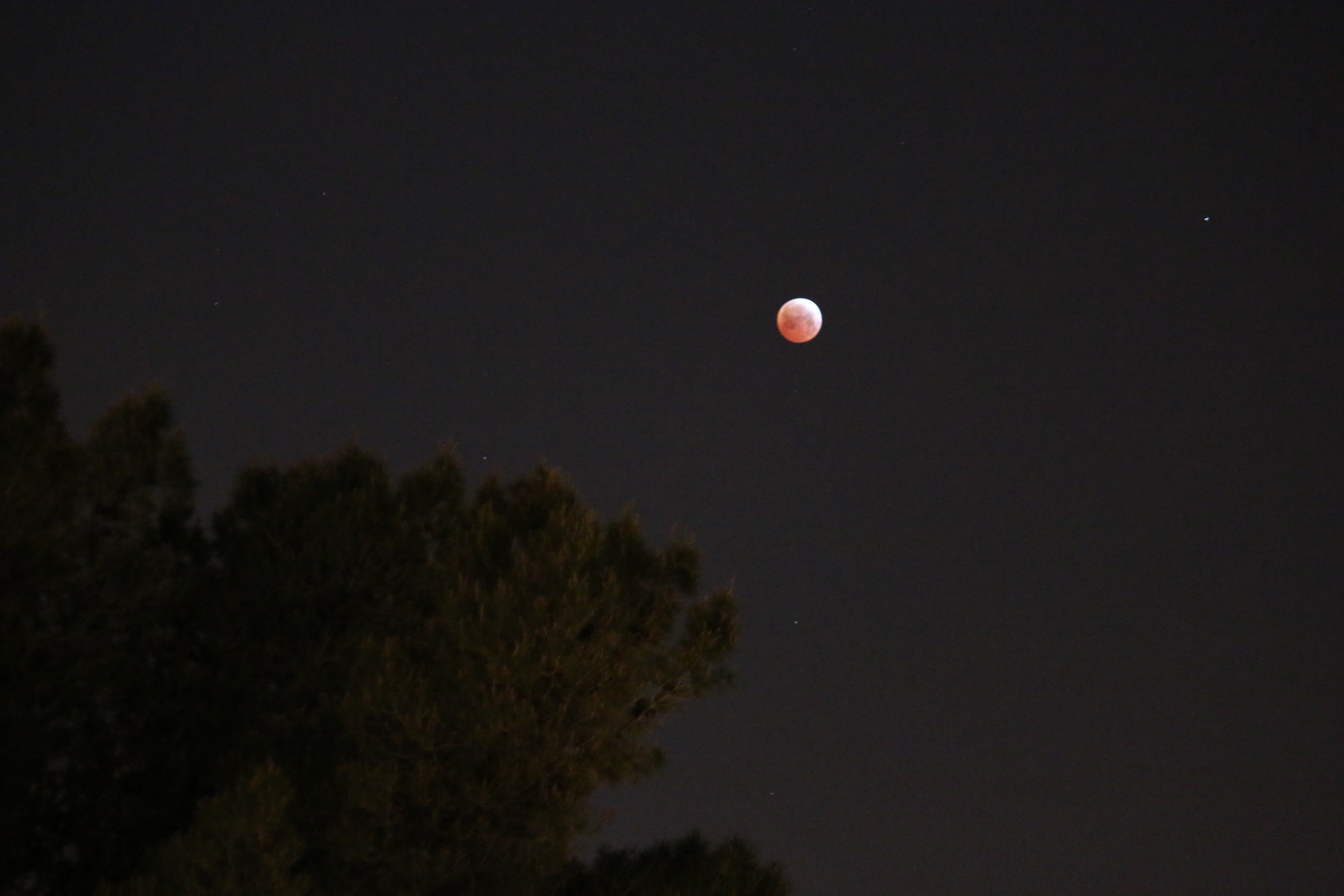
Las Vegas, Nevada, 12:03 UTC

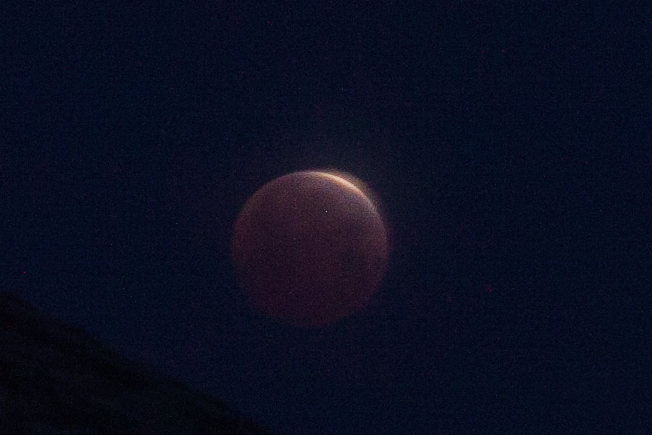
Rio Rancho, New Mexico, 12:13 UTC

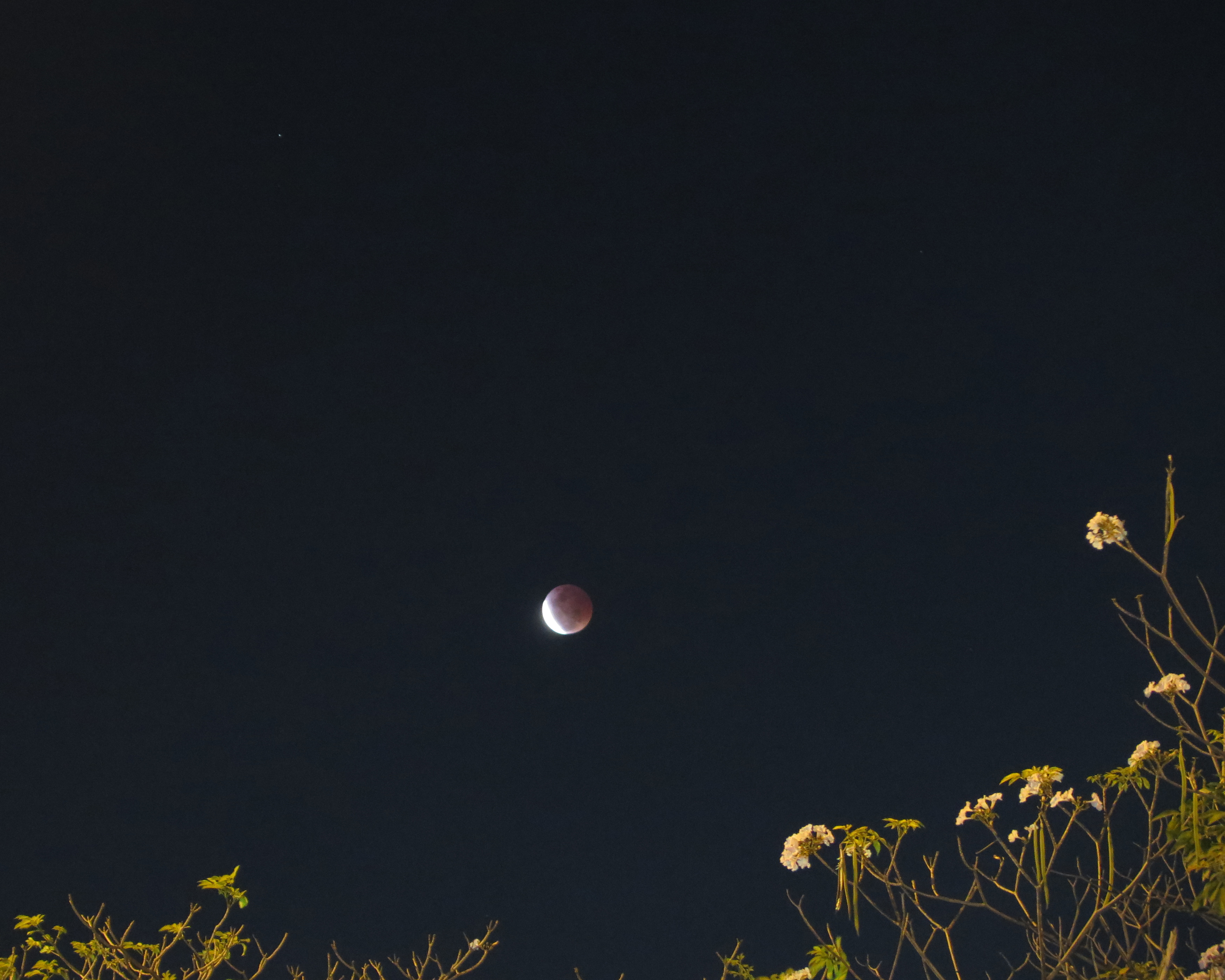
Bangkok, Thailand, 12:37 UTC

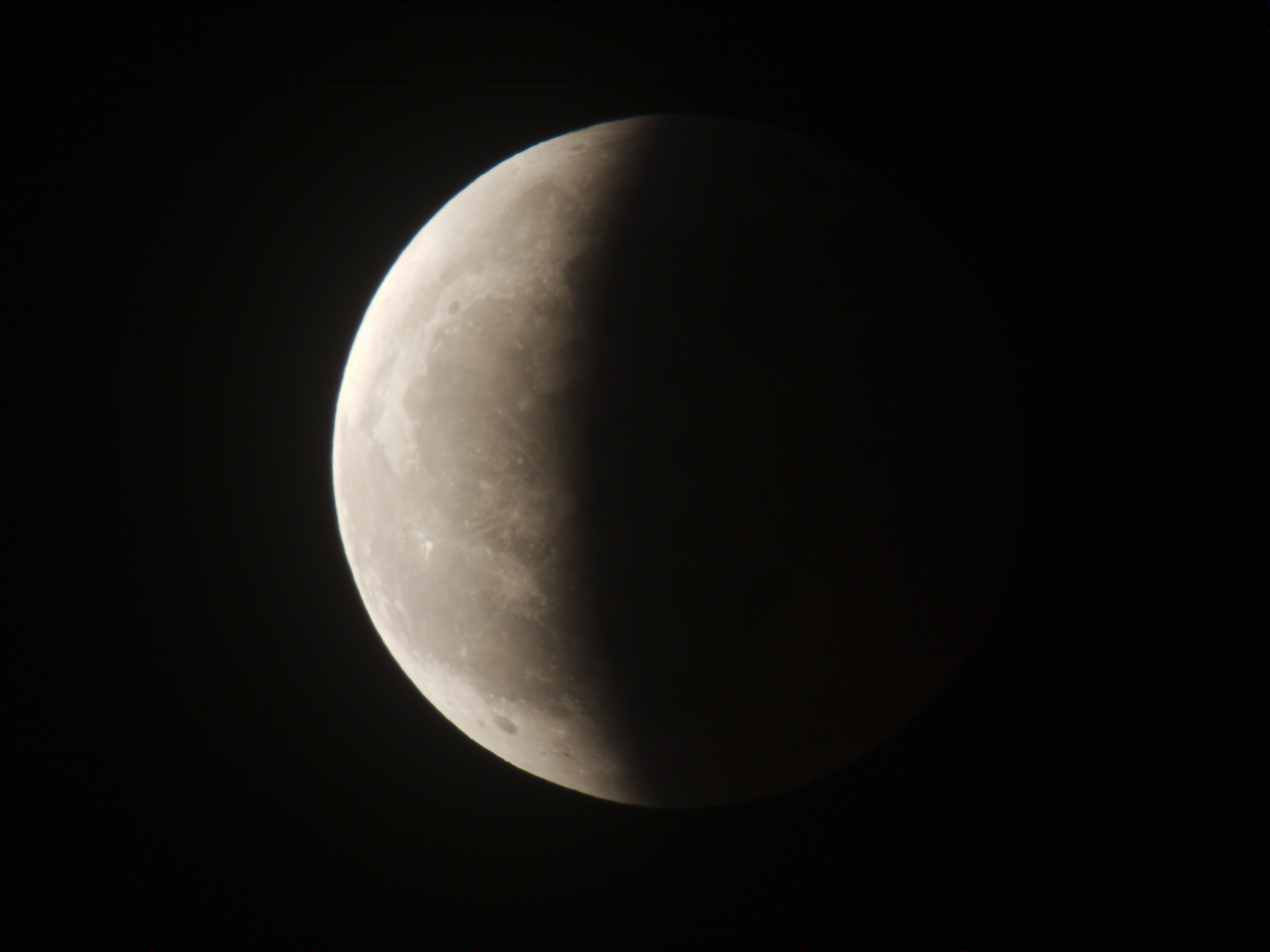
Hirosaki, Aomori, 12:56 UTC

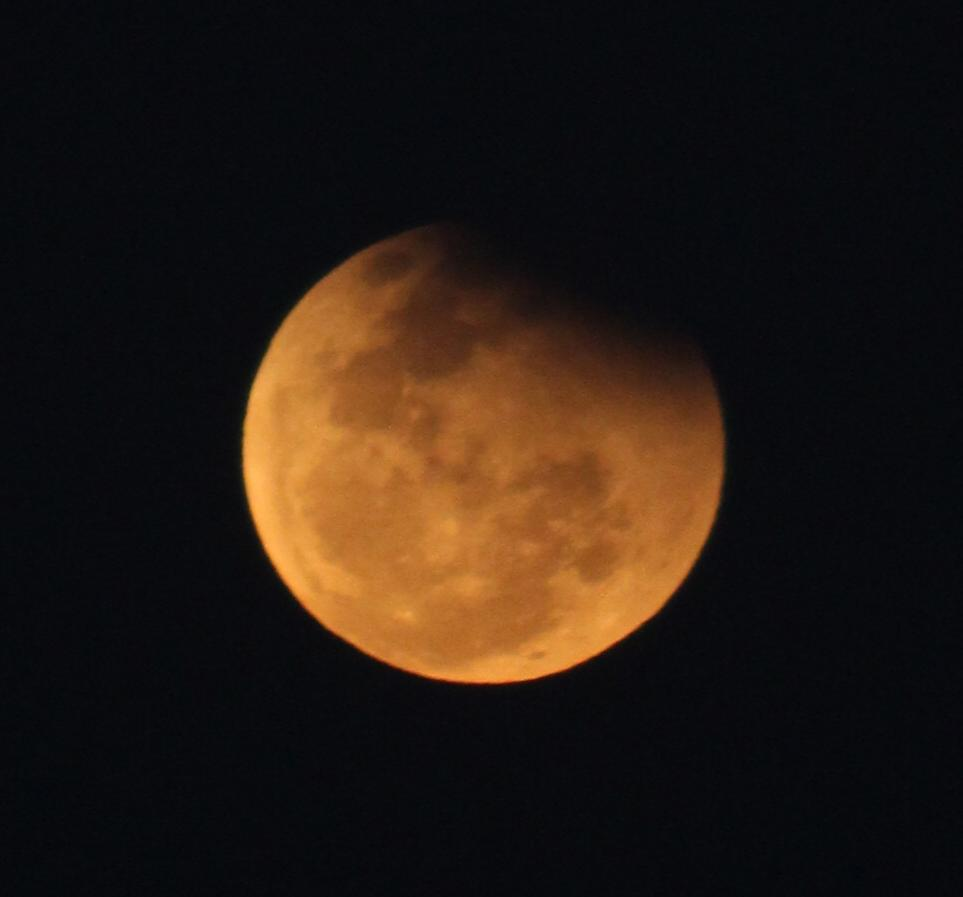
Pune, India, 13:38 UTC

== Eclipse details ==
Shown below is a table displaying details about this particular solar eclipse. It describes various parameters pertaining to this eclipse.

April 4, 2015 Lunar Eclipse Parameters
| Parameter | Value |
|---|---|
| Penumbral Magnitude | 2.08024 |
| Umbral Magnitude | 1.00191 |
| Gamma | 0.44599 |
| Sun Right Ascension | 00h53m01.2s |
| Sun Declination | +05°40'32.8" |
| Sun Semi-Diameter | 15'59.6" |
| Sun Equatorial Horizontal Parallax | 08.8" |
| Moon Right Ascension | 12h53m29.7s |
| Moon Declination | -05°17'20.2" |
| Moon Semi-Diameter | 14'49.9" |
| Moon Equatorial Horizontal Parallax | 0°54'25.9" |
| ΔT | 67.7 s |

== Eclipse season ==
This eclipse is part of an eclipse season, a period, roughly every six months, when eclipses occur. Only two (or occasionally three) eclipse seasons occur each year, and each season lasts about 35 days and repeats just short of six months (173 days) later; thus two full eclipse seasons always occur each year. Either two or three eclipses happen each eclipse season. In the sequence below, each eclipse is separated by a fortnight.

Eclipse season of March–April 2015
| March 20 Descending node (new moon) | April 4 Ascending node (full moon) |
|---|---|
| Total solar eclipse Solar Saros 120 | Total lunar eclipse Lunar Saros 132 |

== Related eclipses ==
=== Eclipses in 2015 ===
- A total solar eclipse on March 20.
- A total lunar eclipse on April 4.
- A partial solar eclipse on September 13.
- A total lunar eclipse on September 28.

=== Metonic ===
- Preceded by: Lunar eclipse of June 15, 2011
- Followed by: Lunar eclipse of January 21, 2019

=== Tzolkinex ===
- Preceded by: Lunar eclipse of February 21, 2008
- Followed by: Lunar eclipse of May 16, 2022

=== Half-Saros ===
- Preceded by: Solar eclipse of March 29, 2006
- Followed by: Solar eclipse of April 8, 2024

=== Tritos ===
- Preceded by: Lunar eclipse of May 4, 2004
- Followed by: Lunar eclipse of March 3, 2026

=== Lunar Saros 132 ===
- Preceded by: Lunar eclipse of March 24, 1997
- Followed by: Lunar eclipse of April 14, 2033

=== Inex ===
- Preceded by: Lunar eclipse of April 24, 1986
- Followed by: Lunar eclipse of March 13, 2044

=== Triad ===
- Preceded by: Lunar eclipse of June 3, 1928
- Followed by: Lunar eclipse of February 3, 2102

=== Lunar eclipses of 2013–2016 ===
This eclipse is a member of a semester series. An eclipse in a semester series of lunar eclipses repeats approximately every 177 days and 4 hours (a semester) at alternating nodes of the Moon's orbit.

The penumbral lunar eclipse on May 25, 2013 occurs in the previous lunar year eclipse set, and the penumbral lunar eclipse on August 18, 2016 occurs in the next lunar year eclipse set.

Lunar eclipse series sets from 2013 to 2016
| Ascending node | | | | Descending node | | | |
| Saros | Date Viewing | Type Chart | Gamma | Saros | Date Viewing | Type Chart | Gamma |
| 112 | 2013 Apr 25 | Partial | −1.0121 | 117 | 2013 Oct 18 | Penumbral | 1.1508 |
| 122 | 2014 Apr 15 | Total | −0.3017 | 127 | 2014 Oct 08 | Total | 0.3827 |
| 132 | 2015 Apr 04 | Total | 0.4460 | 137 | 2015 Sep 28 | Total | −0.3296 |
| 142 | 2016 Mar 23 | Penumbral | 1.1592 | 147 | 2016 Sep 16 | Penumbral | −1.0549 |

=== Saros 132 ===
This eclipse is a part of Saros series 132, repeating every 18 years, 11 days, and containing 71 events. The series started with a penumbral lunar eclipse on May 12, 1492. It contains partial eclipses from August 16, 1636 through March 24, 1997; total eclipses from April 4, 2015 through August 2, 2213; and a second set of partial eclipses from August 13, 2231 through November 30, 2411. The series ends at member 71 as a penumbral eclipse on June 26, 2754.

The longest duration of totality will be produced by member 36 at 106 minutes, 6 seconds on June 9, 2123. All eclipses in this series occur at the Moon’s ascending node of orbit.

| Greatest | First | | | |
|---|---|---|---|---|
| The greatest eclipse of the series will occur on 2123 Jun 09, lasting 106 minutes, 6 seconds. | Penumbral | Partial | Total | Central |
| The greatest eclipse of the series will occur on 2123 Jun 09, lasting 106 minutes, 6 seconds. | 1492 May 12 | 1636 Aug 16 | 2015 Apr 04 | 2069 May 06 |
| The greatest eclipse of the series will occur on 2123 Jun 09, lasting 106 minutes, 6 seconds. | Last | | | |
| The greatest eclipse of the series will occur on 2123 Jun 09, lasting 106 minutes, 6 seconds. | Central | Total | Partial | Penumbral |
| The greatest eclipse of the series will occur on 2123 Jun 09, lasting 106 minutes, 6 seconds. | 2177 Jul 11 | 2213 Aug 02 | 2411 Nov 30 | 2754 Jun 26 |

Eclipses are tabulated in three columns; every third eclipse in the same column is one exeligmos apart, so they all cast shadows over approximately the same parts of the Earth.

Series members 19–40 occur between 1801 and 2200:
| 19 | 20 | 21 |
|---|---|---|
| 1816 Dec 04 | 1834 Dec 16 | 1852 Dec 26 |
| 22 | 23 | 24 |
| 1871 Jan 06 | 1889 Jan 17 | 1907 Jan 29 |
| 25 | 26 | 27 |
| 1925 Feb 08 | 1943 Feb 20 | 1961 Mar 02 |
| 28 | 29 | 30 |
| 1979 Mar 13 | 1997 Mar 24 | 2015 Apr 04 |
| 31 | 32 | 33 |
| 2033 Apr 14 | 2051 Apr 26 | 2069 May 06 |
| 34 | 35 | 36 |
| 2087 May 17 | 2105 May 28 | 2123 Jun 09 |
| 37 | 38 | 39 |
| 2141 Jun 19 | 2159 Jun 30 | 2177 Jul 11 |
40
2195 Jul 22

=== Tritos series ===
This eclipse is a part of a tritos cycle, repeating at alternating nodes every 135 synodic months (≈ 3986.63 days, or 11 years minus 1 month). Their appearance and longitude are irregular due to a lack of synchronization with the anomalistic month (period of perigee), but groupings of 3 tritos cycles (≈ 33 years minus 3 months) come close (≈ 434.044 anomalistic months), so eclipses are similar in these groupings.

Series members between 1801 and 2200
| 1807 Nov 15 (Saros 113) | 1818 Oct 14 (Saros 114) | 1829 Sep 13 (Saros 115) | 1840 Aug 13 (Saros 116) | 1851 Jul 13 (Saros 117) |
| 1862 Jun 12 (Saros 118) | 1873 May 12 (Saros 119) | 1884 Apr 10 (Saros 120) | 1895 Mar 11 (Saros 121) | 1906 Feb 09 (Saros 122) |
| 1917 Jan 08 (Saros 123) | 1927 Dec 08 (Saros 124) | 1938 Nov 07 (Saros 125) | 1949 Oct 07 (Saros 126) | 1960 Sep 05 (Saros 127) |
| 1971 Aug 06 (Saros 128) | 1982 Jul 06 (Saros 129) | 1993 Jun 04 (Saros 130) | 2004 May 04 (Saros 131) | 2015 Apr 04 (Saros 132) |
| 2026 Mar 03 (Saros 133) | 2037 Jan 31 (Saros 134) | 2048 Jan 01 (Saros 135) | 2058 Nov 30 (Saros 136) | 2069 Oct 30 (Saros 137) |
| 2080 Sep 29 (Saros 138) | 2091 Aug 29 (Saros 139) | 2102 Jul 30 (Saros 140) | 2113 Jun 29 (Saros 141) | 2124 May 28 (Saros 142) |
| 2135 Apr 28 (Saros 143) | 2146 Mar 28 (Saros 144) | 2157 Feb 24 (Saros 145) | 2168 Jan 24 (Saros 146) | 2178 Dec 24 (Saros 147) |
| 2189 Nov 22 (Saros 148) | 2200 Oct 23 (Saros 149) | | | |

=== Inex series ===
This eclipse is a part of the long period inex cycle, repeating at alternating nodes, every 358 synodic months (≈ 10,571.95 days, or 29 years minus 20 days). Their appearance and longitude are irregular due to a lack of synchronization with the anomalistic month (period of perigee). However, groupings of 3 inex cycles (≈ 87 years minus 2 months) comes close (≈ 1,151.02 anomalistic months), so eclipses are similar in these groupings.

Series members between 1801 and 2200
| 1812 Aug 22 (Saros 125) | 1841 Aug 02 (Saros 126) | 1870 Jul 12 (Saros 127) |
| 1899 Jun 23 (Saros 128) | 1928 Jun 03 (Saros 129) | 1957 May 13 (Saros 130) |
| 1986 Apr 24 (Saros 131) | 2015 Apr 04 (Saros 132) | 2044 Mar 13 (Saros 133) |
| 2073 Feb 22 (Saros 134) | 2102 Feb 03 (Saros 135) | 2131 Jan 13 (Saros 136) |
| 2159 Dec 24 (Saros 137) | 2188 Dec 04 (Saros 138) | |

=== Half-Saros cycle ===
A lunar eclipse will be preceded and followed by solar eclipses by 9 years and 5.5 days (a half saros). This lunar eclipse is related to two total solar eclipses of solar saros 139.

| March 29, 2006 | April 8, 2024 |

== See also ==
- List of lunar eclipses and List of 21st-century lunar eclipses
