= March 2026 lunar eclipse =

Total lunar eclipse of 3 March 2026

- Total eclipse
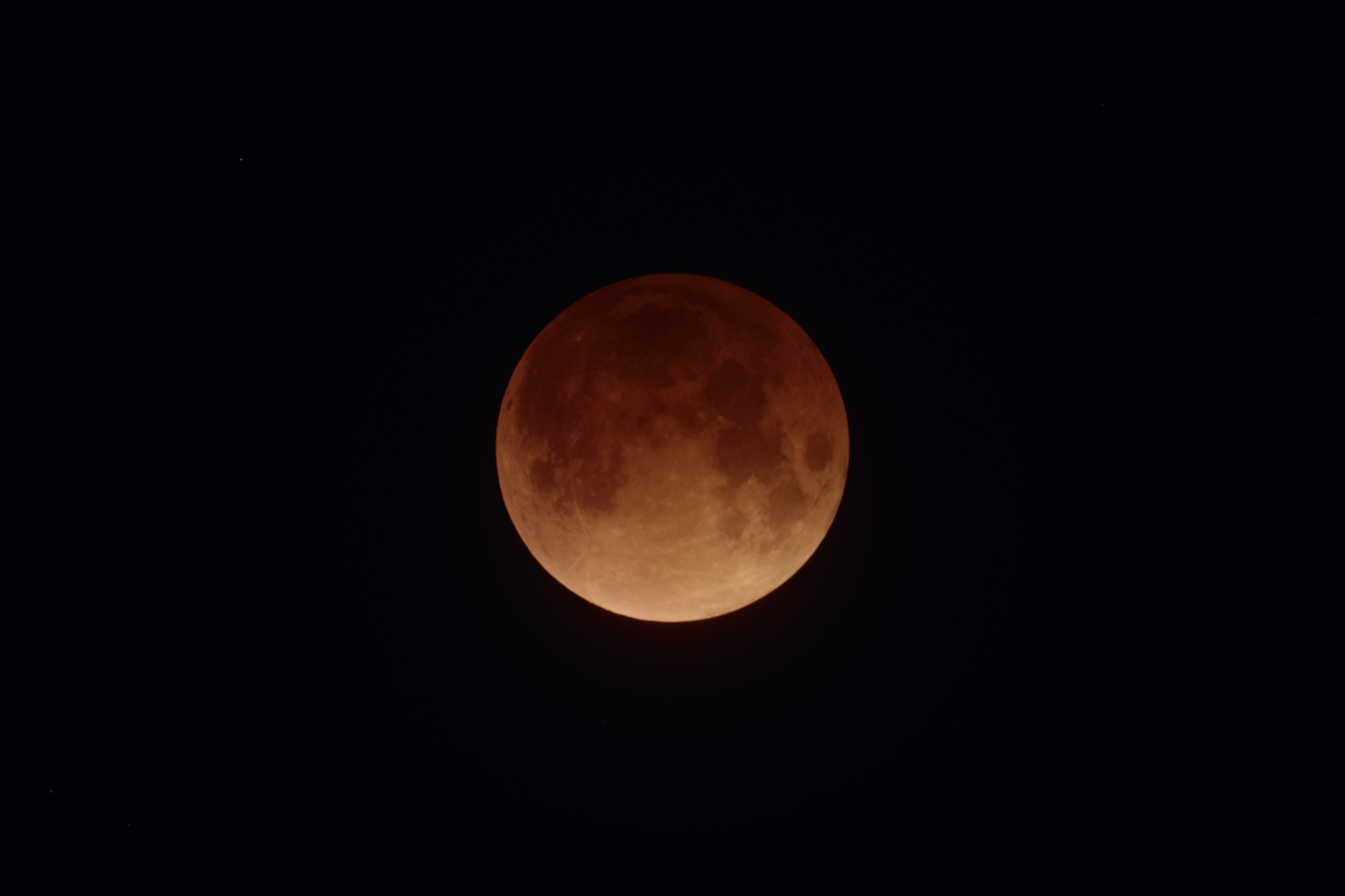
- Totality from Richland, Michigan
- Date: March 3, 2026
- Gamma: −0.3765
- Magnitude: 1.1507
- Saros cycle: 133 (27 of 71)
- Totality: 58 minutes, 19 seconds
- Partiality: 207 minutes, 10 seconds
- Penumbral: 338 minutes, 37 seconds
Contacts (UTC)
- P1: 8:44:22
- U1: 9:50:00
- U2: 11:04:26
- Greatest: 11:33:37
- U3: 12:02:45
- U4: 13:17:10
- P4: 14:22:59

A total lunar eclipse occurred at the Moon's descending node of orbit on Tuesday, March 3, 2026, with an umbral magnitude of 1.1507. A lunar eclipse occurs when the Moon moves into the Earth's shadow, causing the Moon to be darkened. A total lunar eclipse occurs when the Moon's near side entirely passes into the Earth's umbral shadow. Unlike a solar eclipse, which can only be viewed from a relatively small area of the world, a lunar eclipse may be viewed from anywhere on the night side of Earth. A total lunar eclipse can last up to nearly two hours, while a total solar eclipse lasts only a few minutes at any given place, because the Moon's shadow is smaller. The Moon's apparent diameter was near the average, as it occurred 6.7 days after perigee (on February 24, 2026, at 18:15 UTC) and 6.9 days before apogee (on March 10, 2026, at 09:45 UTC).

This lunar eclipse was the third of an almost tetrad, with the others being on March 14, 2025 (total); September 8, 2025 (total); and August 28, 2026 (partial).

During the eclipse, the Moon occulted NGC 3423 over North America. Deep-sky objects are rarely occulted during a total eclipse from any given spot on Earth.

This eclipse fell on the Lantern Festival, the first since February 11, 2017.

== Visibility ==
The eclipse was completely visible over northeast Asia, northwestern North America, and the central Pacific Ocean, seen rising over much of Asia and Australia and setting over North and South America.

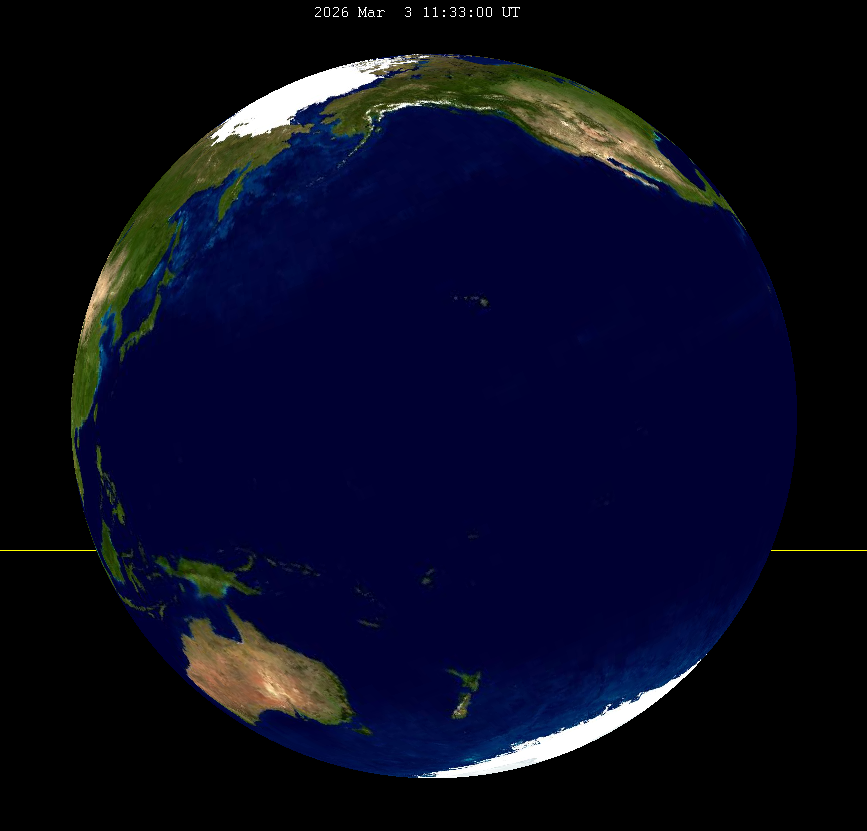
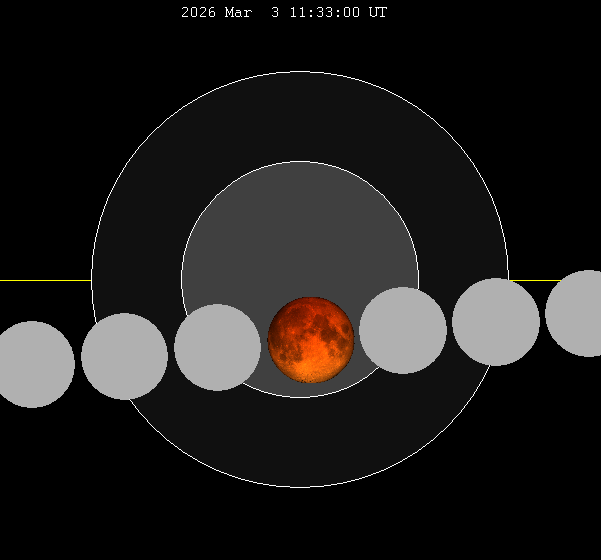
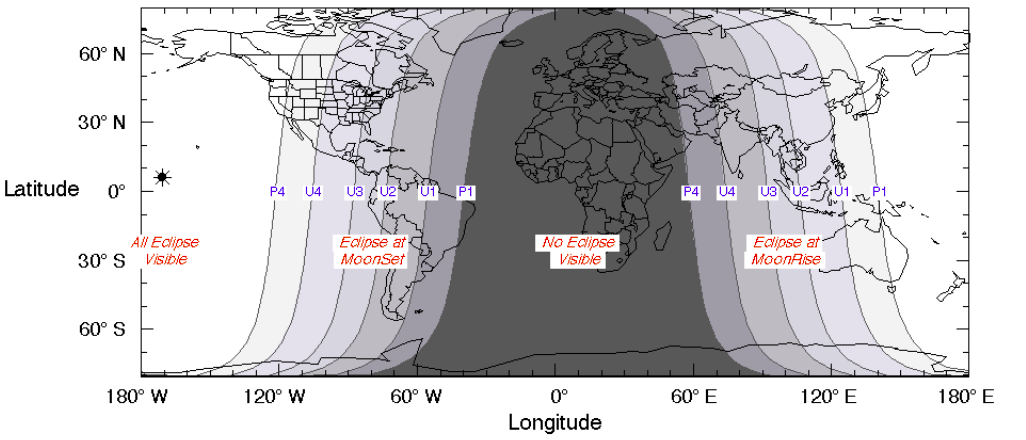
Visibility map

== Gallery ==
Composite of lunar eclipse from Kitt Peak National Observatory, Arizona, US

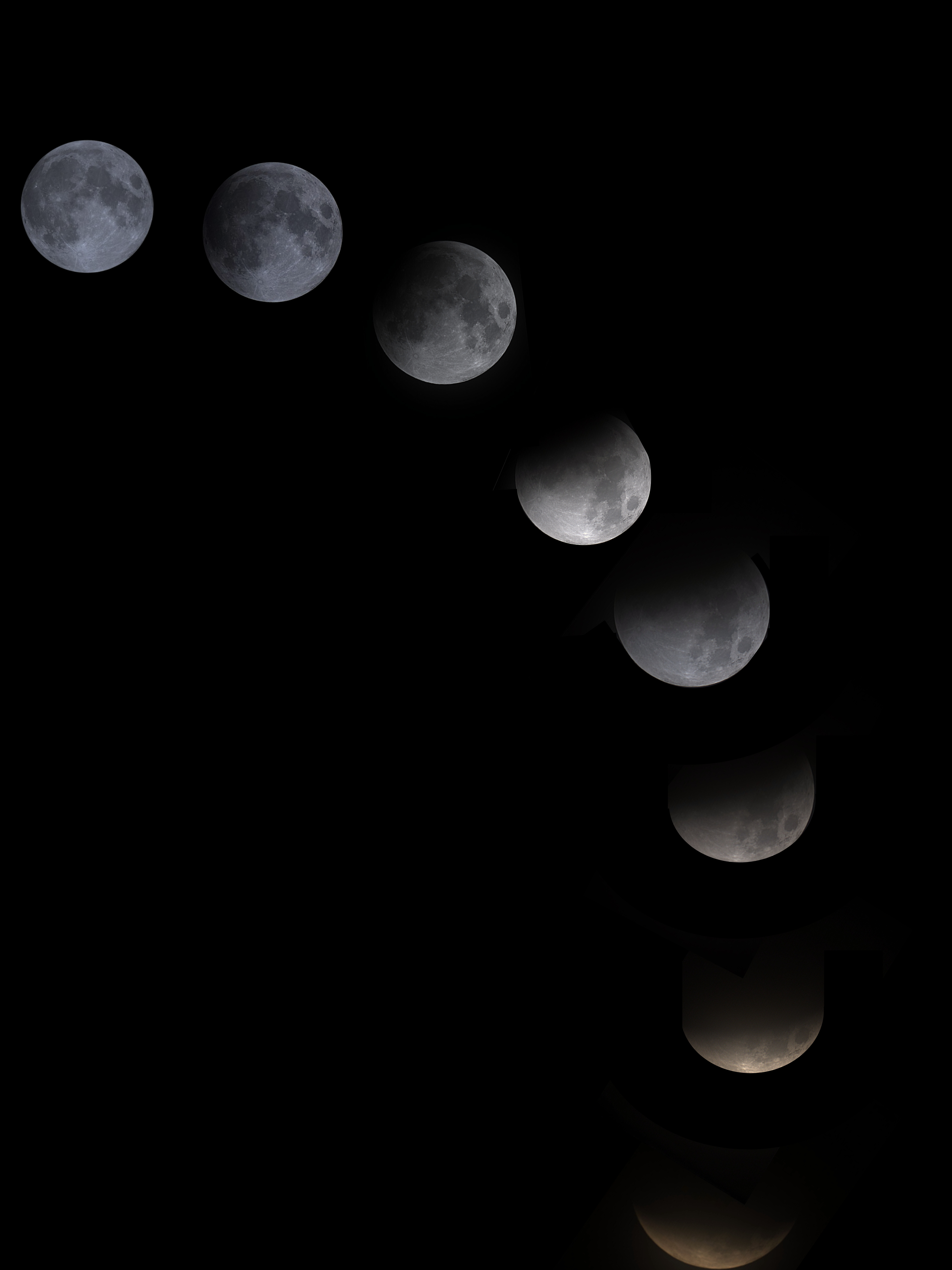
Composite photo of the eclipse, as viewed from Parry Sound, Ontario, Canada

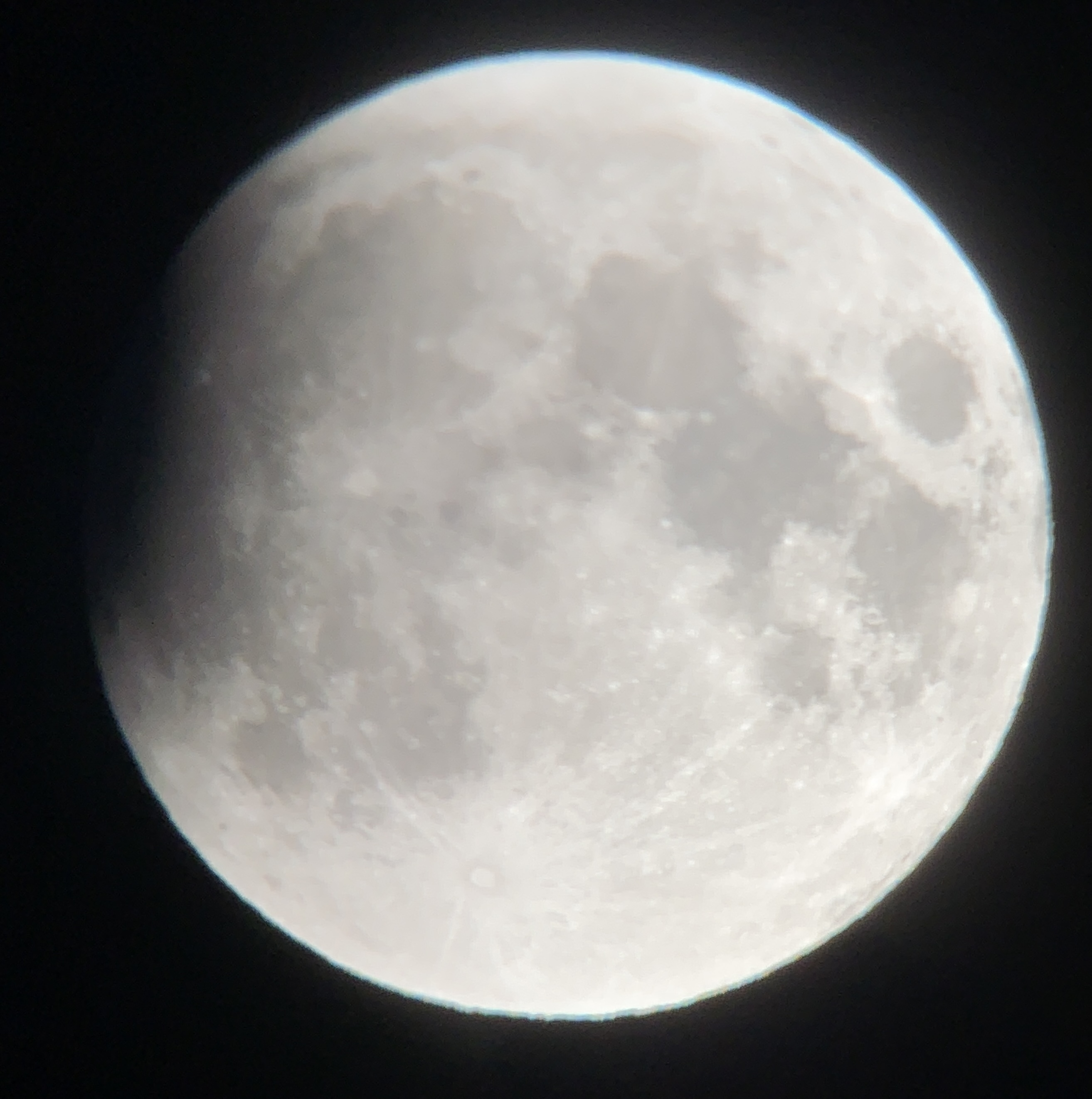
Partial from Halls Harbour, Nova Scotia, Canada, 9:53 UTC

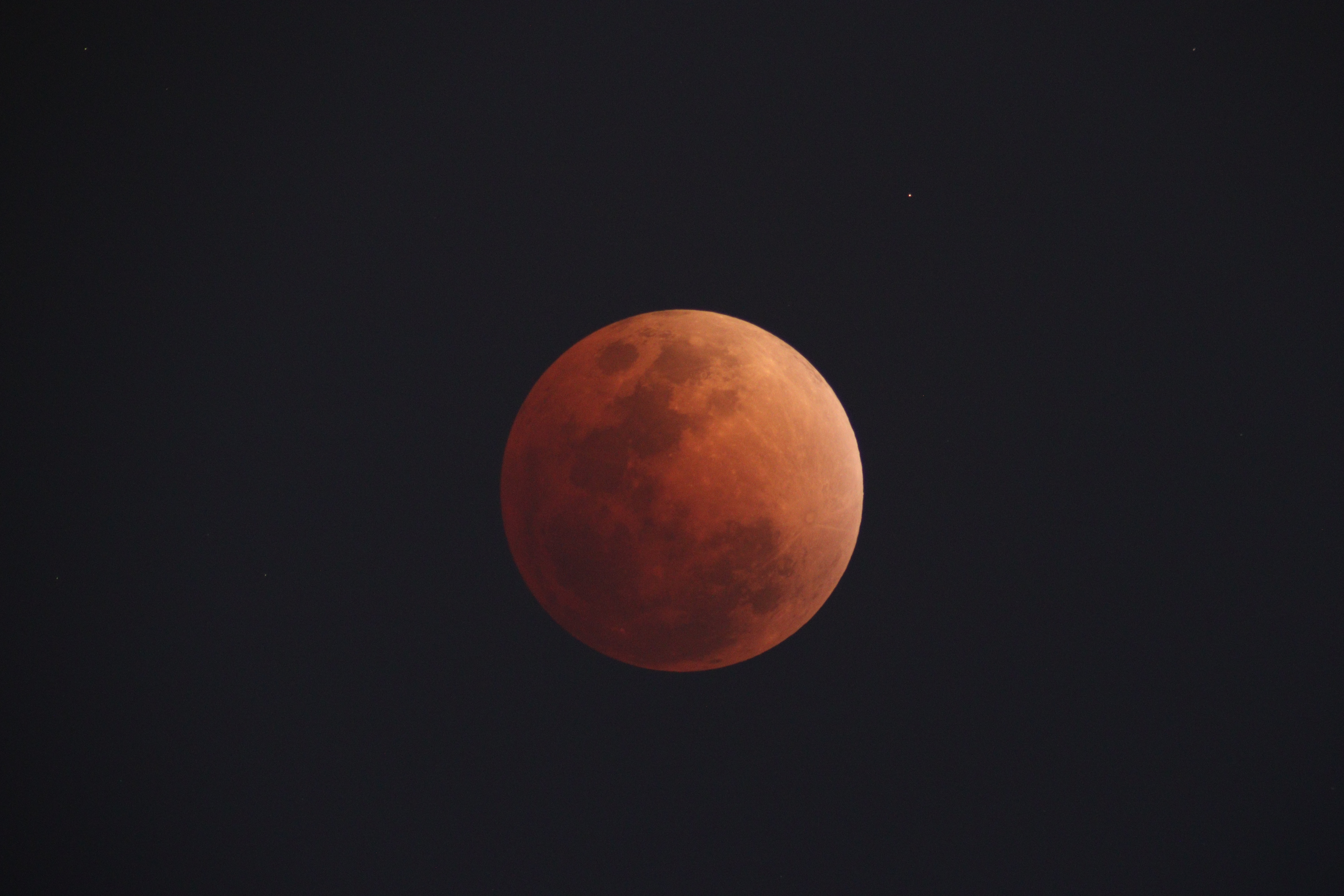
Metro Manila, Philippines, 11:23 UTC

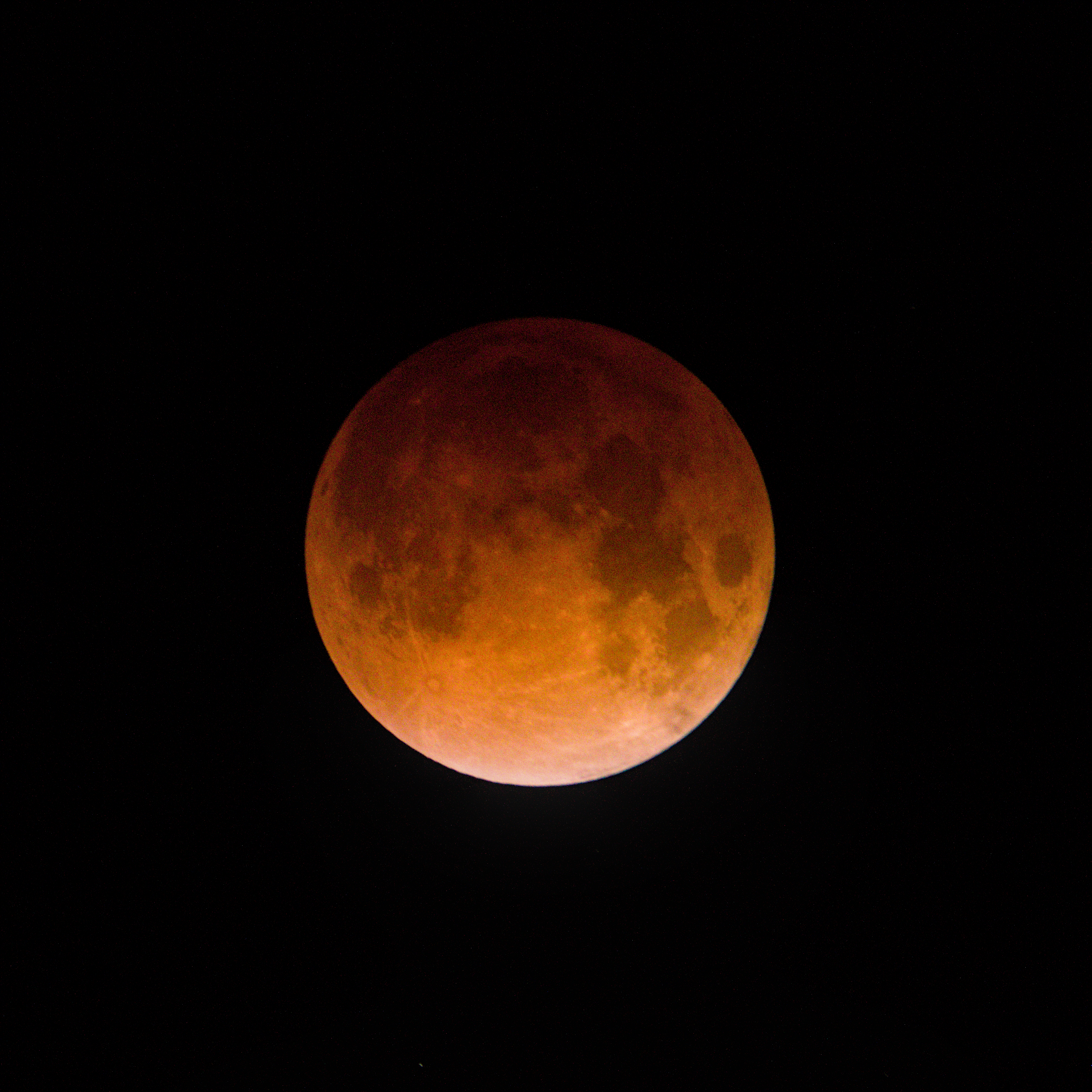
Woodland, California, US, 11:25 UTC

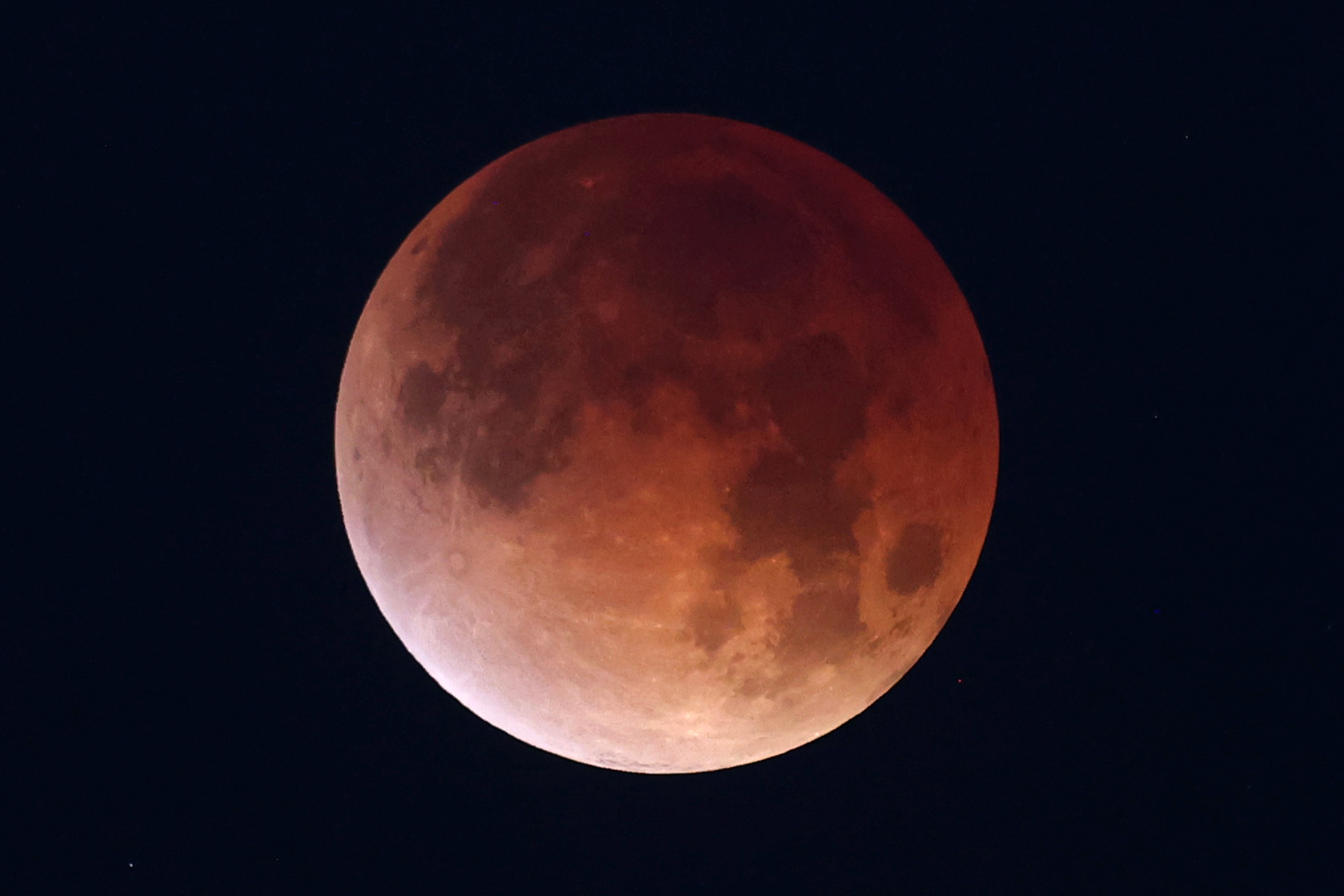
New Orleans, Louisiana, US, 11:28 UTC

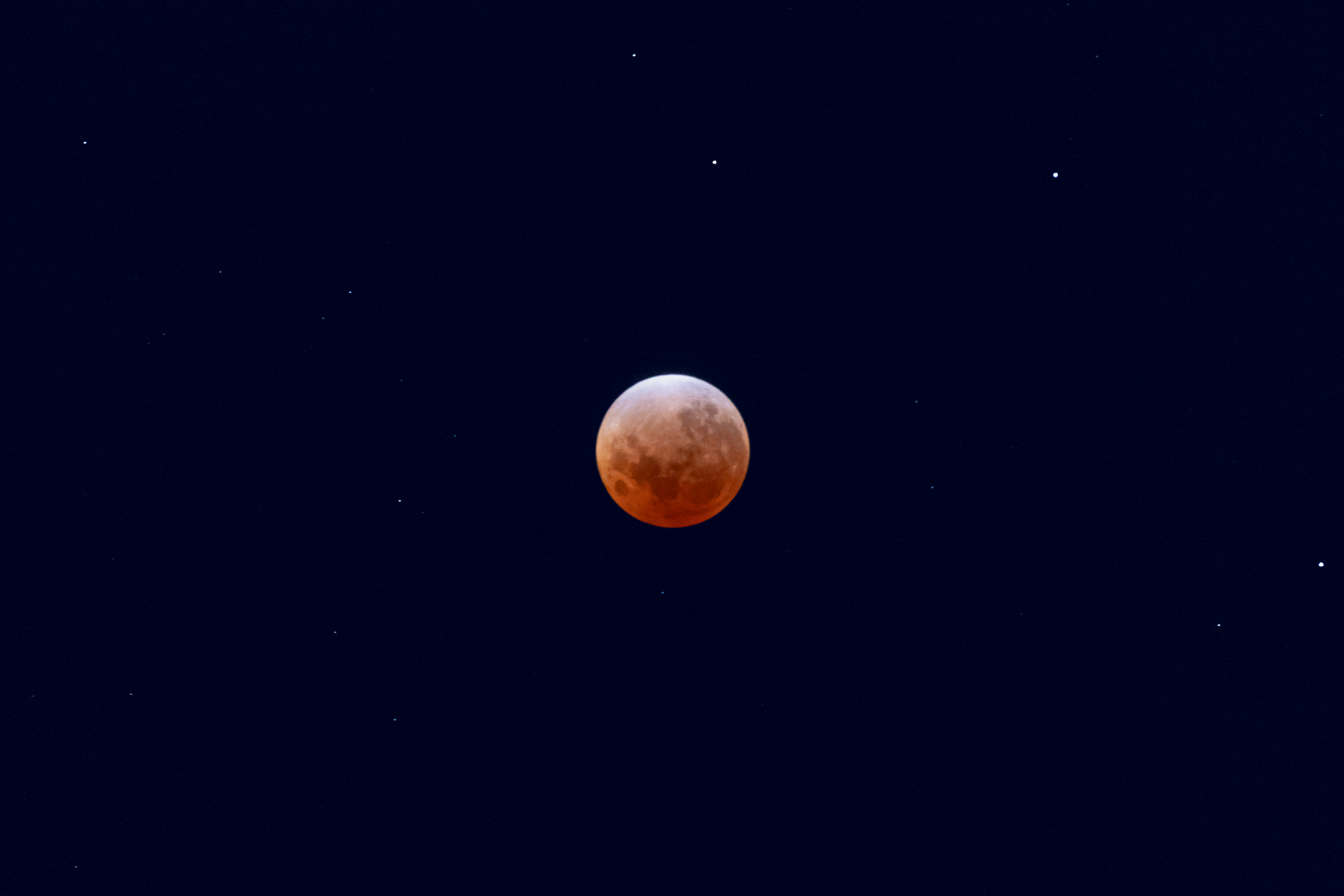
Porirua, New Zealand, 11:47 UTC

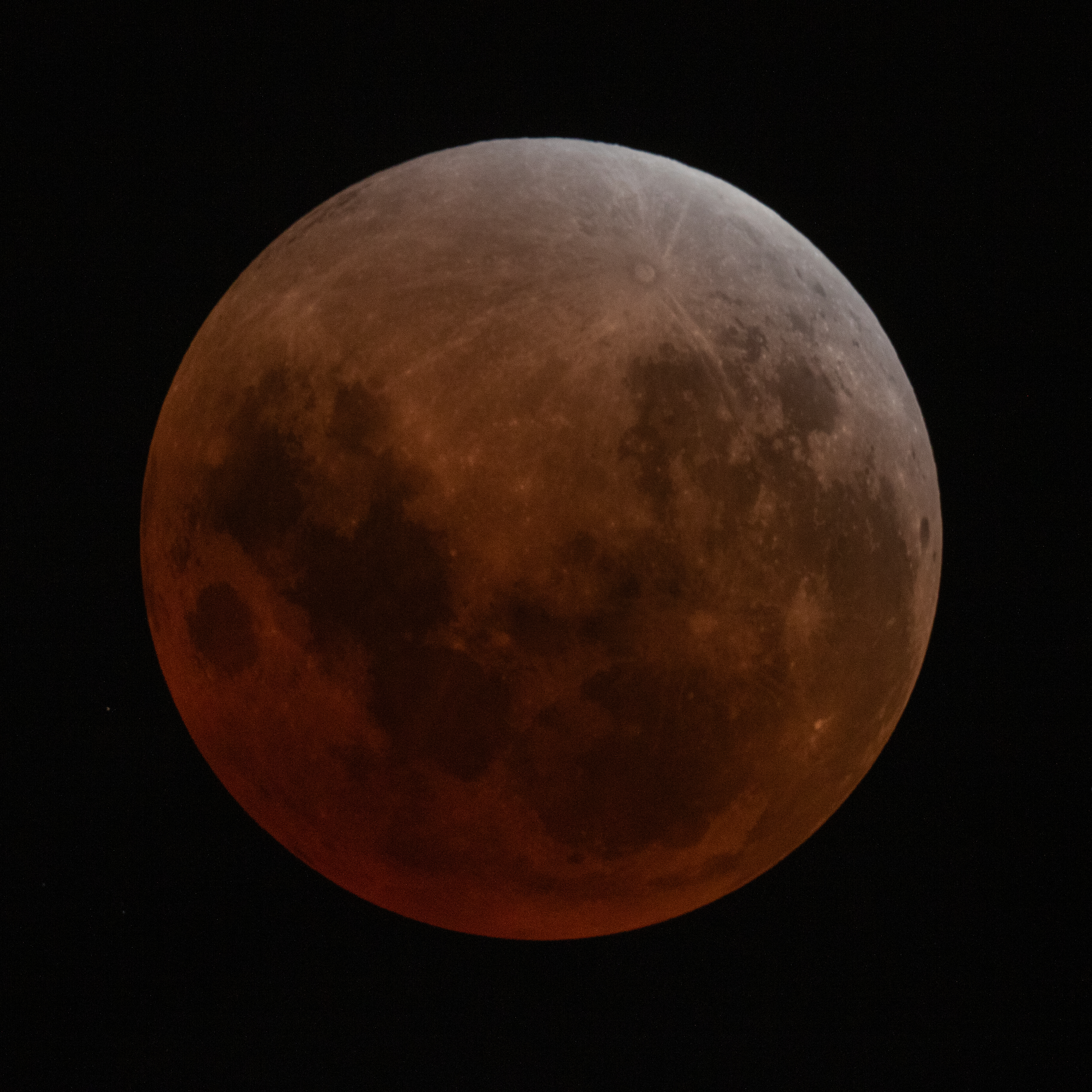
Sydney, New South Wales, Australia, 12:00 UTC

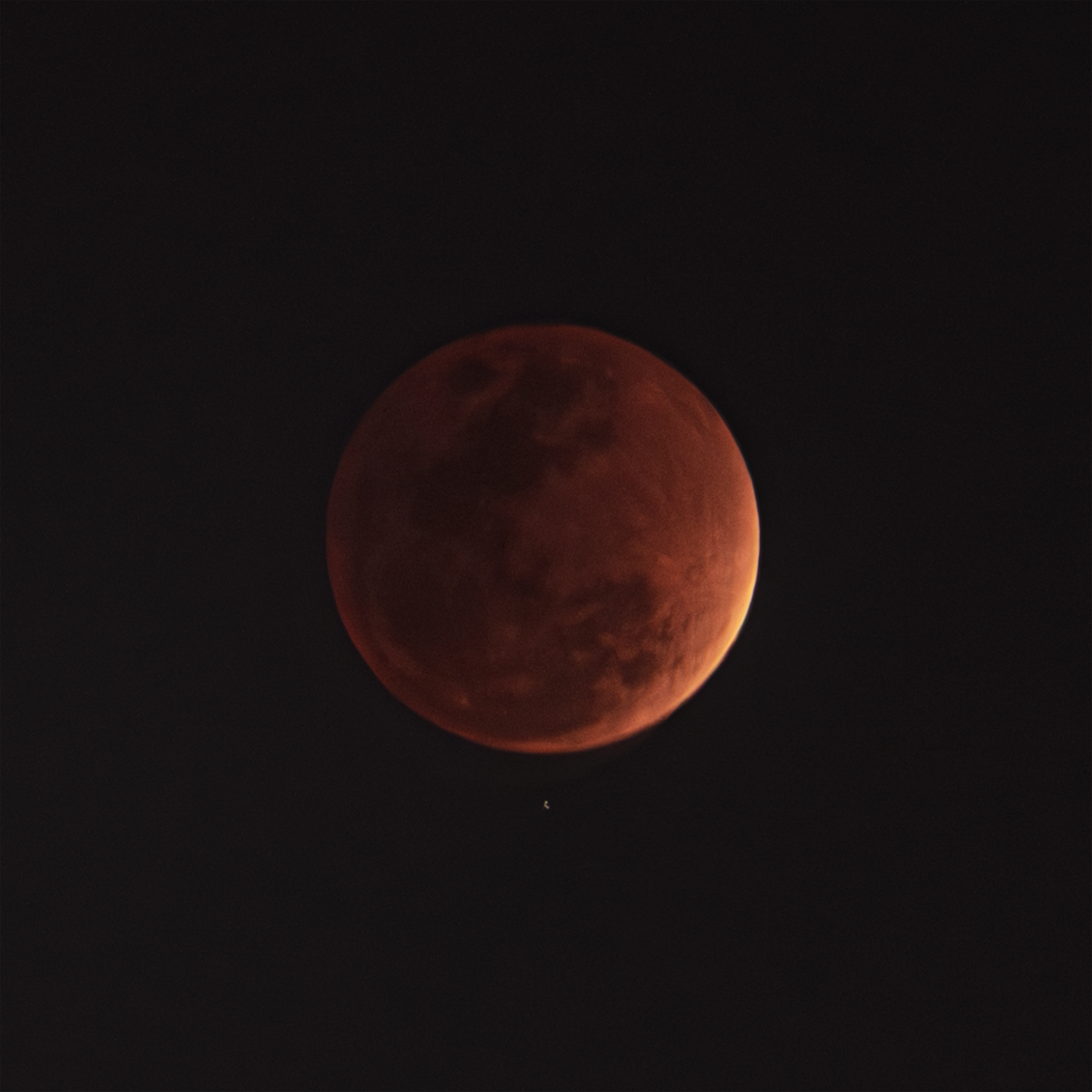
Pak Kret district, Nonthaburi, Thailand, 12:01 UTC

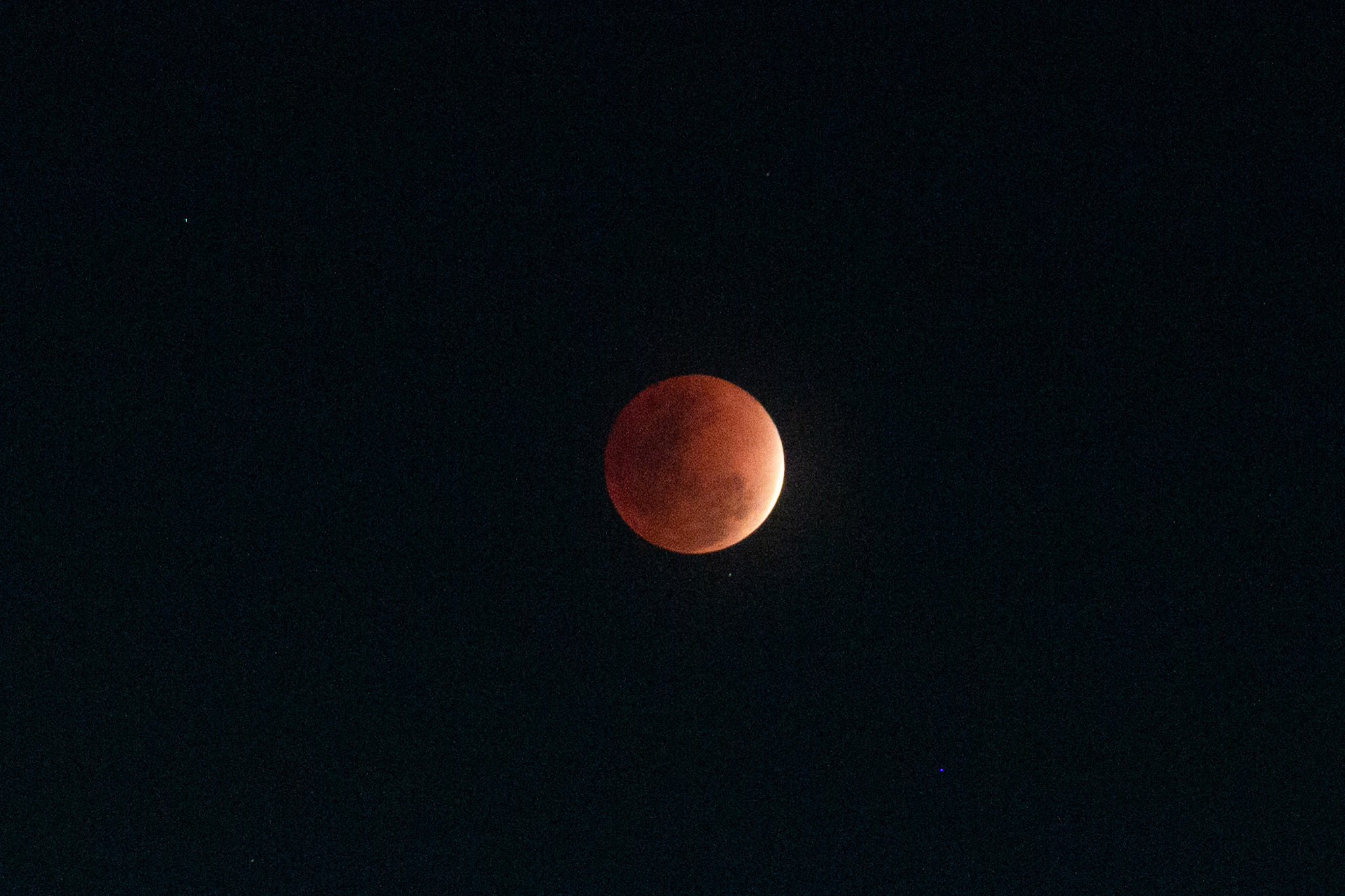
Partial from Đồng Nai, Vietnam, 12:04 UTC, just after totality

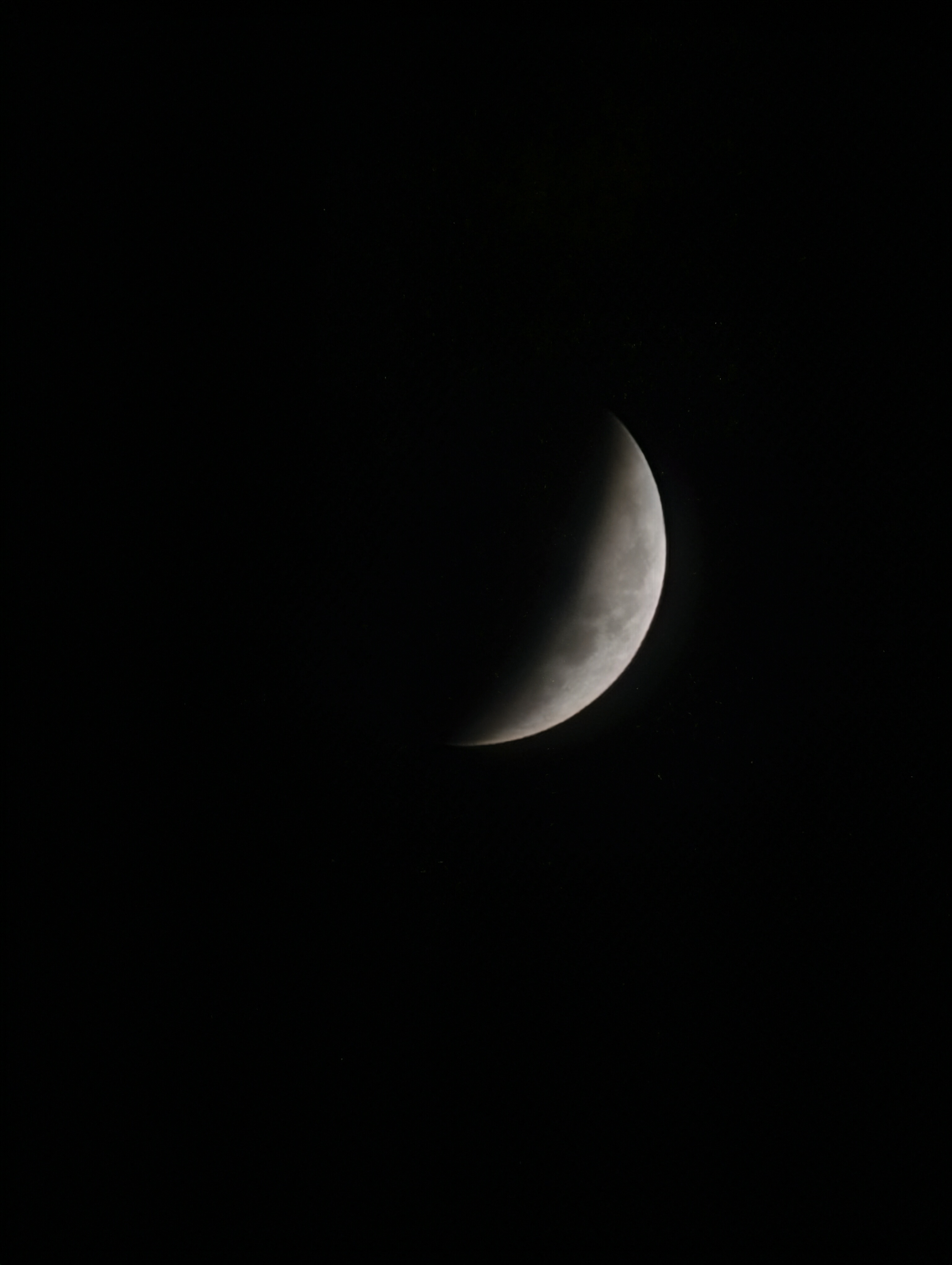
Partial from Pitas, Malaysia, 12:24 UTC

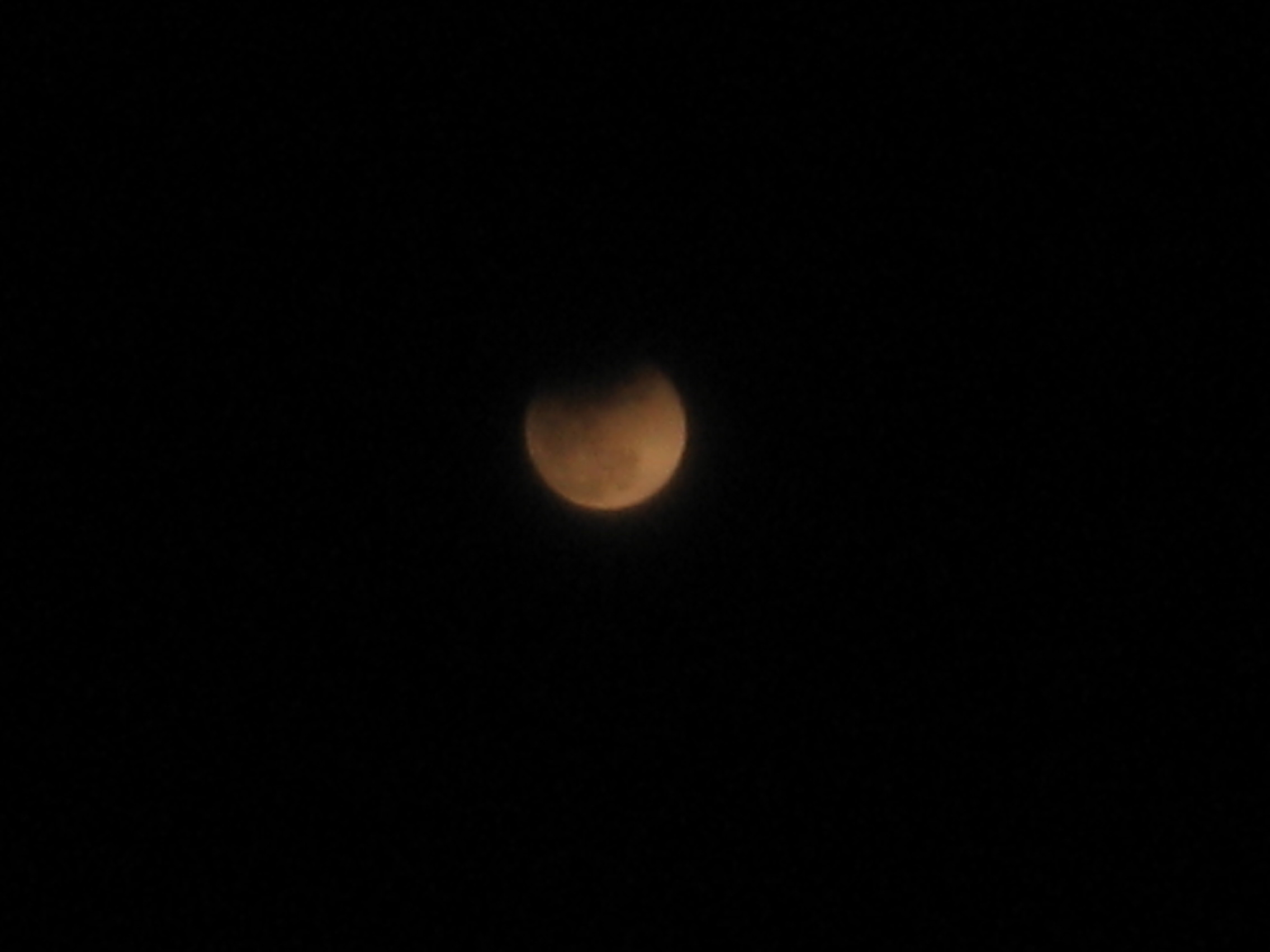
Partial from Hefei, China, 13:09 UTC

== Eclipse details ==
Shown below is a table displaying details about this particular lunar eclipse. It describes various parameters pertaining to this eclipse.

March 3, 2026 Lunar Eclipse Parameters
Parameter	Value
Penumbral Magnitude	2.18580
Umbral Magnitude	1.15263
Gamma	−0.37651
Sun Right Ascension	22h56m56.0s
Sun Declination	−06°43'06.4"
Sun Semi-Diameter	16'08.0"
Sun Equatorial Horizontal Parallax	08.9"
Moon Right Ascension	10h56m15.0s
Moon Declination	+06°24'05.3"
Moon Semi-Diameter	15'37.0"
Moon Equatorial Horizontal Parallax	0°57'18.7"
ΔT	72.1 s

== Eclipse season ==
This eclipse is part of an eclipse season, a period, roughly every six months, when eclipses occur. Only two (or occasionally three) eclipse seasons occur each year, and each season lasts about 35 days and repeats just short of six months (173 days) later; thus two full eclipse seasons always occur each year. Either two or three eclipses happen each eclipse season. In the sequence below, each eclipse is separated by a fortnight.

Eclipse season of February–March 2026
February 17 Ascending node (new moon)	March 3 Descending node (full moon)
Annular solar eclipse Solar Saros 121	Total lunar eclipse Lunar Saros 133

== Related eclipses ==
=== Eclipses in 2026 ===
- An annular solar eclipse on February 17.
- A total lunar eclipse on March 3.
- A total solar eclipse on August 12.
- A partial lunar eclipse on August 28.

=== Metonic ===
- Preceded by: Lunar eclipse of May 16, 2022
- Followed by: Lunar eclipse of December 20, 2029

=== Tzolkinex ===
- Preceded by: Lunar eclipse of January 21, 2019
- Followed by: Lunar eclipse of April 14, 2033

=== Half-Saros ===
- Preceded by: Solar eclipse of February 26, 2017
- Followed by: Solar eclipse of March 9, 2035

=== Tritos ===
- Preceded by: Lunar eclipse of April 4, 2015
- Followed by: Lunar eclipse of January 31, 2037

=== Lunar Saros 133 ===
- Preceded by: Lunar eclipse of February 21, 2008
- Followed by: Lunar eclipse of March 13, 2044

=== Inex ===
- Preceded by: Lunar eclipse of March 24, 1997
- Followed by: Lunar eclipse of February 11, 2055

=== Triad ===
- Preceded by: Lunar eclipse of May 3, 1939
- Followed by: Lunar eclipse of January 2, 2113

=== Lunar eclipses of 2024–2027 ===
This eclipse is a member of a semester series. An eclipse in a semester series of lunar eclipses repeats approximately every 177 days and 4 hours (a semester) at alternating nodes of the Moon's orbit.

The penumbral lunar eclipse on July 18, 2027 occurs in the next lunar year eclipse set.

Lunar eclipse series sets from 2024 to 2027
Descending node				Ascending node			
Saros	Date Viewing	Type Chart	Gamma	Saros	Date Viewing	Type Chart	Gamma
113	2024 Mar 25	Penumbral	1.0610	118	2024 Sep 18	Partial	−0.9792
123	2025 Mar 14	Total	0.3485	128	2025 Sep 07	Total	−0.2752
133	2026 Mar 03	Total	−0.3765	138	2026 Aug 28	Partial	0.4964
143	2027 Feb 20	Penumbral	−1.0480	148	2027 Aug 17	Penumbral	1.2797

=== Metonic series ===
The Metonic cycle repeats nearly exactly every 19 years and represents a Saros cycle plus one lunar year. Because it occurs on the same calendar date, the Earth's shadow will be in nearly the same location relative to the background stars.

1. 1988 Mar 03.675 – Partial (113); 2. 2007 Mar 03.972 – Total (123); 3. 2026 Mar 03.481 – Total (133); 4. 2045 Mar 03.320 – Penumbral (143)	1. 1988 Aug 27.461 – partial (118); 2. 2007 Aug 28.442 – total (128); 3. 2026 Aug 28.175 – partial (138); 4. 2045 Aug 27.578 – penumbral (148)

=== Saros 133 ===
This eclipse is a part of Saros series 133, repeating every 18 years, 11 days, and containing 71 events. The series started with a penumbral lunar eclipse on May 13, 1557. It contains partial eclipses from August 7, 1683 through December 17, 1899; total eclipses from December 28, 1917 through August 3, 2278; and a second set of partial eclipses from August 14, 2296 through March 11, 2639. The series ends at member 71 as a penumbral eclipse on June 29, 2819.

The longest duration of totality will be produced by member 35 at 101 minutes, 41 seconds on May 30, 2170. All eclipses in this series occur at the Moon’s descending node of orbit.

Greatest	First			
The greatest eclipse of the series will occur on 2170 May 30, lasting 101 minutes, 41 seconds.	Penumbral	Partial	Total	Central
The greatest eclipse of the series will occur on 2170 May 30, lasting 101 minutes, 41 seconds.	1557 May 13	1683 Aug 07	1917 Dec 28	2098 Apr 15
The greatest eclipse of the series will occur on 2170 May 30, lasting 101 minutes, 41 seconds.	Last			
The greatest eclipse of the series will occur on 2170 May 30, lasting 101 minutes, 41 seconds.	Central	Total	Partial	Penumbral
The greatest eclipse of the series will occur on 2170 May 30, lasting 101 minutes, 41 seconds.	2224 Jul 01	2278 Aug 03	2639 Mar 11	2819 Jun 29

Eclipses are tabulated in three columns; every third eclipse in the same column is one exeligmos apart, so they all cast shadows over approximately the same parts of the Earth.

Series members 15–36 occur between 1801 and 2200:
15	16	17
1809 Oct 23	1827 Nov 03	1845 Nov 14
18	19	20
1863 Nov 25	1881 Dec 05	1899 Dec 17
21	22	23
1917 Dec 28	1936 Jan 08	1954 Jan 19
24	25	26
1972 Jan 30	1990 Feb 09	2008 Feb 21
27	28	29
2026 Mar 03	2044 Mar 13	2062 Mar 25
30	31	32
2080 Apr 04	2098 Apr 15	2116 Apr 27
33	34	35
2134 May 08	2152 May 18	2170 May 30
36
2188 Jun 09

=== Tritos series ===
This eclipse is a part of a tritos cycle, repeating at alternating nodes every 135 synodic months (≈ 3986.63 days, or 11 years minus 1 month). Their appearance and longitude are irregular due to a lack of synchronization with the anomalistic month (period of perigee), but groupings of 3 tritos cycles (≈ 33 years minus 3 months) come close (≈ 434.044 anomalistic months), so eclipses are similar in these groupings.

Series members between 1801 and 2200
1807 Nov 15 (Saros 113)	1818 Oct 14 (Saros 114)	1829 Sep 13 (Saros 115)	1840 Aug 13 (Saros 116)	1851 Jul 13 (Saros 117)
1862 Jun 12 (Saros 118)	1873 May 12 (Saros 119)	1884 Apr 10 (Saros 120)	1895 Mar 11 (Saros 121)	1906 Feb 09 (Saros 122)
1917 Jan 08 (Saros 123)	1927 Dec 08 (Saros 124)	1938 Nov 07 (Saros 125)	1949 Oct 07 (Saros 126)	1960 Sep 05 (Saros 127)
1971 Aug 06 (Saros 128)	1982 Jul 06 (Saros 129)	1993 Jun 04 (Saros 130)	2004 May 04 (Saros 131)	2015 Apr 04 (Saros 132)
2026 Mar 03 (Saros 133)	2037 Jan 31 (Saros 134)	2048 Jan 01 (Saros 135)	2058 Nov 30 (Saros 136)	2069 Oct 30 (Saros 137)
2080 Sep 29 (Saros 138)	2091 Aug 29 (Saros 139)	2102 Jul 30 (Saros 140)	2113 Jun 29 (Saros 141)	2124 May 28 (Saros 142)
2135 Apr 28 (Saros 143)	2146 Mar 28 (Saros 144)	2157 Feb 24 (Saros 145)	2168 Jan 24 (Saros 146)	2178 Dec 24 (Saros 147)
2189 Nov 22 (Saros 148)	2200 Oct 23 (Saros 149)			

=== Inex series ===
This eclipse is a part of the long period inex cycle, repeating at alternating nodes, every 358 synodic months (≈ 10,571.95 days, or 29 years minus 20 days). Their appearance and longitude are irregular due to a lack of synchronization with the anomalistic month (period of perigee). However, groupings of 3 inex cycles (≈ 87 years minus 2 months) comes close (≈ 1,151.02 anomalistic months), so eclipses are similar in these groupings.

Series members between 1801 and 2200
1823 Jul 23 (Saros 126)	1852 Jul 01 (Saros 127)	1881 Jun 12 (Saros 128)
1910 May 24 (Saros 129)	1939 May 03 (Saros 130)	1968 Apr 13 (Saros 131)
1997 Mar 24 (Saros 132)	2026 Mar 03 (Saros 133)	2055 Feb 11 (Saros 134)
2084 Jan 22 (Saros 135)	2113 Jan 02 (Saros 136)	2141 Dec 13 (Saros 137)
2170 Nov 23 (Saros 138)	2199 Nov 02 (Saros 139)	

=== Half-Saros cycle ===
A lunar eclipse will be preceded and followed by solar eclipses by 9 years and 5.5 days (a half saros). This lunar eclipse is related to two annular solar eclipses of Solar Saros 140.

February 26, 2017	March 9, 2035

== See also ==
- List of lunar eclipses and List of 21st-century lunar eclipses
- Solar eclipse of February 17, 2026 - Took place two weeks earlier
