= NGC 3423 =

Galaxy in the constellation Sextans

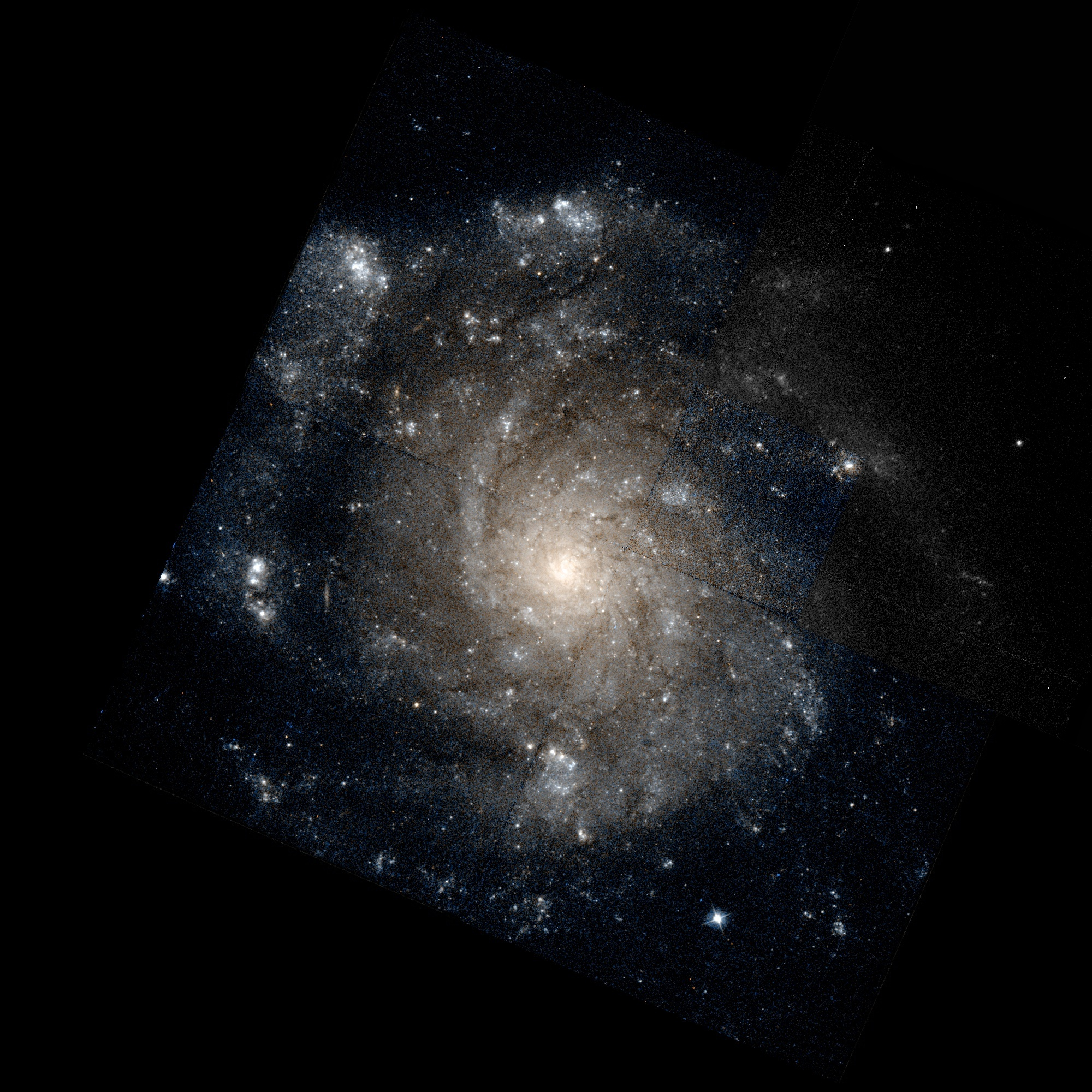
- NGC 3423 imaged by the Hubble Space Telescope

Observation data (J2000 epoch)
- Constellation: Sextans
- Right ascension: 10^{h} 51^{m} 14.2926^{s}
- Declination: +05° 50′ 24.190″
- Redshift: 0.003349 ± 0.000007
- Heliocentric radial velocity: 1,004 ± 2 km/s
- Distance: 42 ± 7.9 Mly (12.9 ± 2.4 Mpc)
- Apparent magnitude (V): 10.9

Characteristics
- Type: SA(s)cd
- Size: ~53,000 ly (16.1 kpc) (estimated)
- Apparent size (V): 3.8′ × 3.2′

Other designations
- UGC 5962, MCG +01-28-012, PGC 32529, CGCG 038-029

NGC 3423 is a spiral galaxy in the constellation Sextans. The galaxy lies about 45 million light years away from Earth, which means, given its apparent dimensions, that NGC 3423 is approximately 50,000 light years across. It was discovered by William Herschel on February 23, 1784.

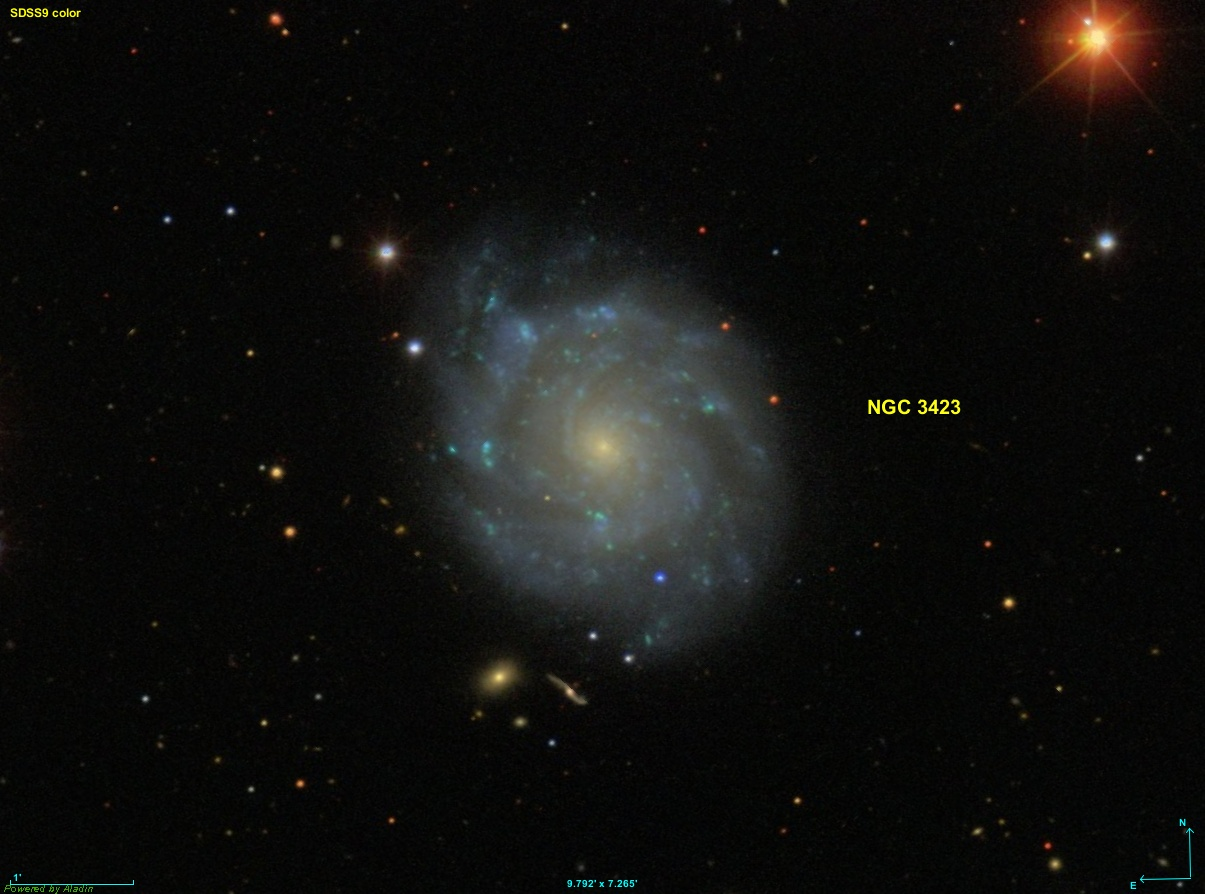
NGC 3423 imaged by SDSS

NGC 3423 is an unbarred galaxy seen nearly face-on. The galaxy has a low-surface-brightness disk. The galaxy has multiple spiral arms, at least six, with numerous HII regions all over the disk. The largest of them are about 2 arcseconds across. H-alpha emission is stronger at inner part of the disk. The star formation rate is estimated to be 0.7 M_{☉} per year.

NGC 3423 is the foremost galaxy of the NGC 3423 Group, which also includes MRK 1271. Other nearby galaxies include NGC 3365, NGC 3495, and NGC 3521.

During the March 2026 lunar eclipse, a total lunar eclipse, it was occulted by the Moon over North America.

== Supernova and luminous blue variable ==
One supernova and one luminous blue variable have been observed in NGC 3423.

- SN 2009ls was discovered on 23 November 2009 by Koichi Nishiyama and Fujio Kabashima at an apparent magnitude of 15.3. Its spectrum revealed it was a young Type II supernova.
- AT 2019ahd was discovered by ATLAS on 29 January 2019. It was identified as a luminous blue variable in outburst.
