= Fox Observatory =

Observatory in Sunrise, Florida

- Organization: Florida Amateur Astronomers Association
- Location: Markham Park, Sunrise, Florida, US
- Coordinates: 26°7′45.5″N 80°21′35.7″W
- Weather: Variable
- Website: http://www.sfaaa.com/

Telescopes
- unnamed: 16" SCT
- Meade LX200: 14" SCT
- Brandon Refractor: 6" refractor
- unnamed: 13" DOB
- unnamed: 8" DOB

Fox Observatory is an astronomical observatory owned and operated by South Florida Amateur Astronomers Association. It is located in Sunrise, Florida (US).

In the late 1960s, Dr. Joseph Dennison Fox, Professor of Astronomy and History, completed his tenure at the University of Puerto Rico, and with his wife Sylvia, retired to North Miami. He brought with him an optical tube assembly for a 6-inch f/15 refractor. This telescope, in its updated and restored state, now resides in the Fox Observatory, on the grounds of Markham Park. The lens and original tube assembly were built by Chester Brandon, renowned as a designer of eyepieces and objective lenses. (The lens was ground from special blanks made by Dow-Corning. The uniqueness of the glass and the increased air space and thickness qualified the lens for a new patent.) The mounting of the telescope is made in part from a landing gear off a World War II, P-38 fighter.

In 1965, the South Florida Amateur Astronomers Association Inc., was formed. In 1970, Dr. Fox joined, and in June 1973, he donated the Brandon refractor to the club. The refractor was to be housed in a yet-to-be-built observatory, located west of Fort Lauderdale. The new observatory would be named for Dr. Fox in recognition of his generosity and leadership.

Initial plans for the grounds, building and roof were drawn up on July 13, 1974. Broward County okayed the final architectural drawings on November 10, 1975, and the building permit was issued on Thursday, November 13. The observatory was officially named for Dr. Fox a week later, on the 20th.

On Sunday, March 20, 1977, at 4:30 p.m., one year behind schedule, the Fox Astronomical Observatory was dedicated. The Brandon refractor, with its P-38 mount and asbestos covered aluminum tube, was in its present position. Present at the dedication was astronomer Jack Horkheimer.

In 1978, a vintage, 1923, Zeiss mount became available for the 6-inch Brandon refractor through Art Smith of the Miami Space Transit Planetarium. When the new mount was installed, the P-38 mount was stored, but later lost.

Between August 1993 and July 1995, the Brandon refractor was restored by Tom Peters, a club member and restorations expert. The club voted to put the job of refurbishing the entire instrument, including the Zeiss equatorial mount, in Tom's skillful hands on August 5, 1993. Everything was dismantled, and the objective was sent to D & G Optical to be refinished. After completion of the task, Barry Greiner, of D & G, mounted the objective in a new aluminum tube, with light baffles. (The surface tested at better than 1/20 wave, measured at the surface.)

Since the opening of the observatory in 1977, more than 100,000 visitors have visited the observatory, located in Markham Park, 12 miles west of Fort Lauderdale, Florida on SR-84, and it is available for public viewing every Saturday evening.

== See also ==
- List of observatories
