= LBN 251 =

Emission nebula in the constellation Cygnus

Nebula
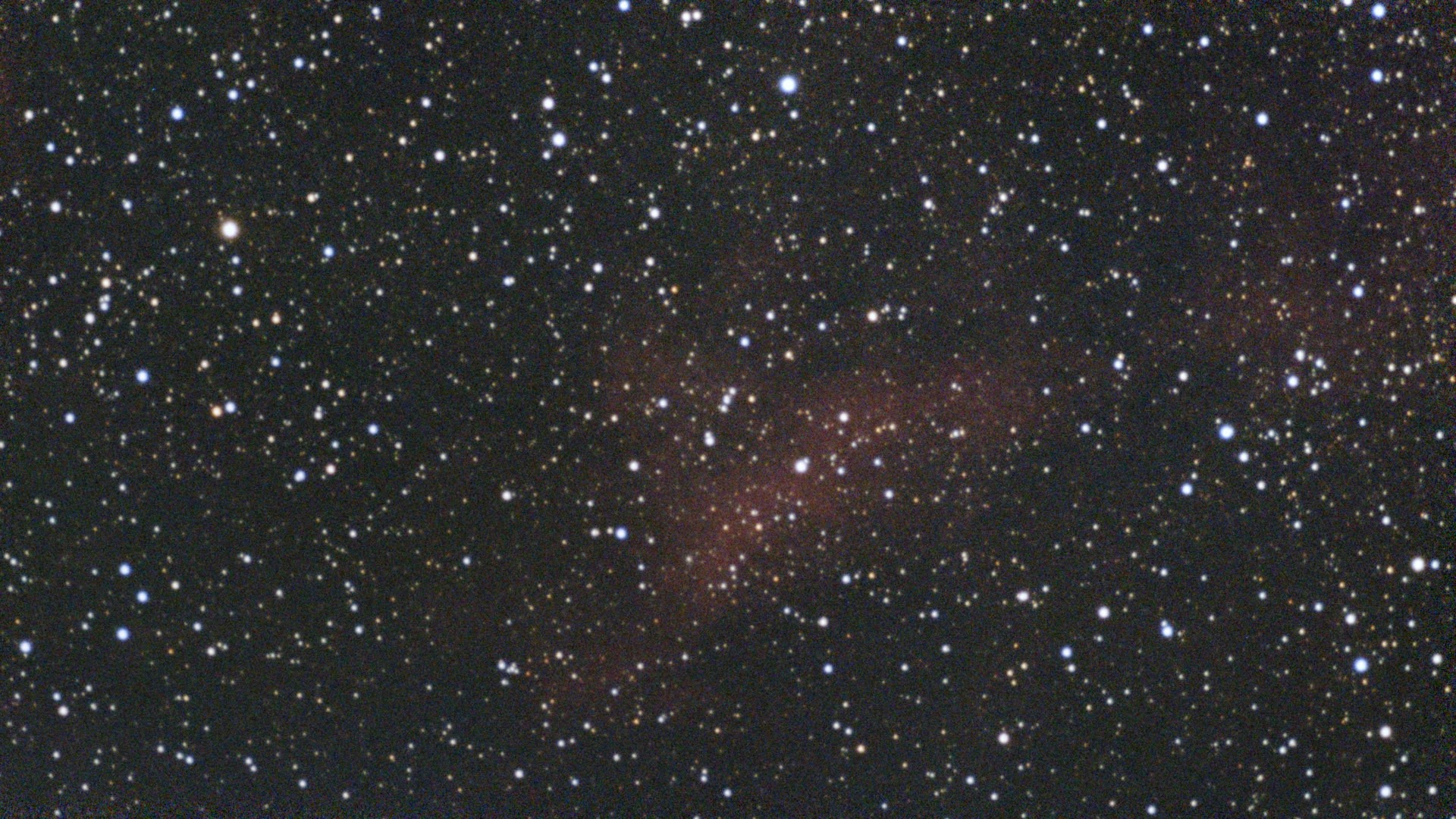
- LBN 251 imaged in 2026

Observation data: epoch
- Right ascension: 20^{h} 17^{m}
- Declination: +41° 54′
- Constellation: Cygnus
- Designations: IC 1318A, LBN 251, LBN 078.85+03.60, The Longhorn, Summer Dolphin Nebula, Manatee Nebula, Space Shuttle Nebula

LBN 251, also known as The Longhorn, is an emission nebula in Cygnus. The nebula is dimmer than other nebulae in Cygnus, and is therefore observed primarily through long-exposure photography. It is part of the Cygnus molecular cloud. The nebula is ionized by nearby stars, however it is not itself a star-forming region. The nebula is internally divided into two clouds, divided by cold dust.
