= Cygnus Molecular Nebula Complex =

Giant molecular cloud in the Milky Way

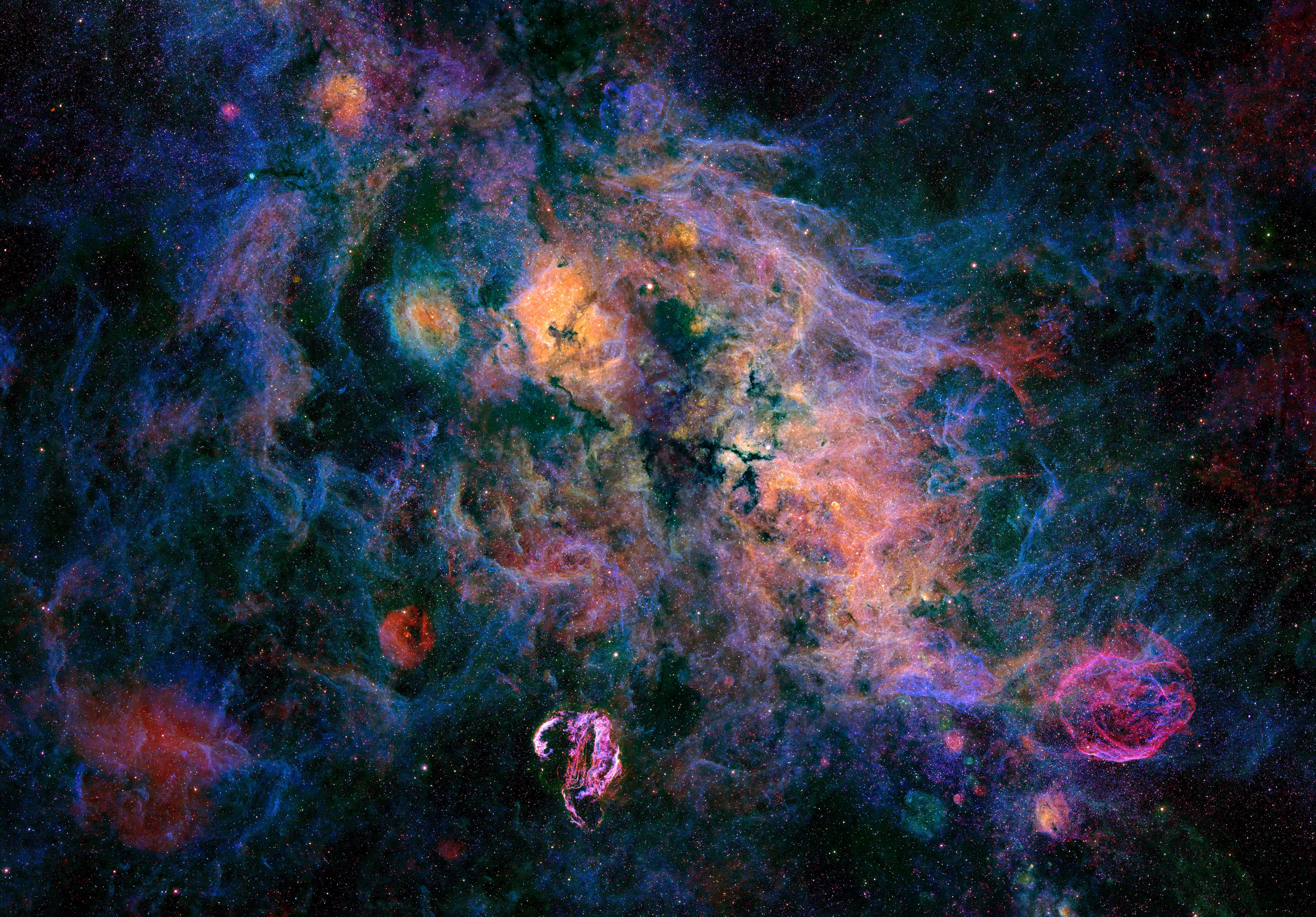
- False color image of the Cygnus Molecular Nebula Complex, highlighting narrowband emission sources

- IAU Cygnus chart
- Object type: Region H II
- Other designations: IC 1318; Sh2-109

Observation data (Epoch J2000.0)
- Constellation: Cygnus (constellation)
- Right ascension: 20^{h} 20^{m}
- Declination: 40°
- Distance: 500 / 1533
- Mass: 10.000–100.000 M_{☉}
- Notable features: Massive giant molecular cloud

The Cygnus Molecular Nebular Complex (also known simply as the Swan Complex) is a giant molecular cloud located in the heart of the boreal Milky Way, in the direction of the constellation Cygnus. It is one of the most turbulent star-forming areas in the Milky Way Galaxy and its largest known molecular nebula complex. Within it are several H II regions, vast and brilliant stellar associations, open clusters, and a large number of some of the brightest stars in the galaxy.

The most notable structure in the complex is known by the catalog abbreviation Sh2-109; it is a vast ensemble, spanning hundreds of light-years, of H II regions, ionized by very bright stars, concentrated in the various OB Association found in this area of the sky. Sh2-109 is also the brightest and most prominent part of the huge molecular nebula complex known as Cygnus X; the total mass of gas and dust in this region is between 10,000 and 100,000 solar masss.

The region lies on the boundary between the Orion Arm, in which the Solar System is located, and the Perseus Arm, at a distance estimated at 5,000 light-years; the complex would still be in an early stage of its evolution, as would be evidenced by the presence of some extremely young and concentrated open clusters with bright and massive stellar components. In the furthest part of the region, connected to one of the OB associations in the area, is the well-known Cygnus X-1 object, an X-ray source thought by many to be a black hole sucking matter from its companion star, a blue supergiant.

== Observation ==
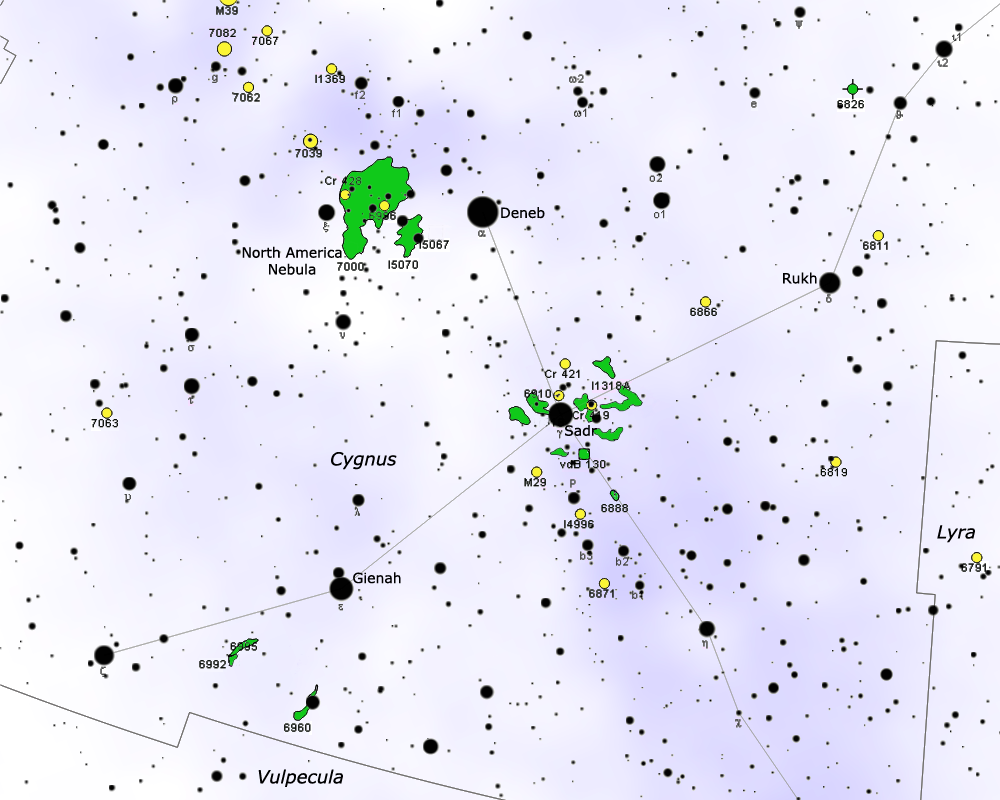
Map centered on the Cygnus molecular complex around the star Sadr (Gamma Cygni); however, much of the complex remains hidden by the dense clouds of dark dust visible between Sadr and Deneb.

The Cygnus complex is located in the direction of the stretch of sky between the bright star Deneb and Sadr, the heart of the Swan; however, neither with the naked eye nor with binoculars or a small telescope can detect it; what appears with a small instrument is a collection of aggregates of stars and small open clusters, which form a fairly obvious flare to the point that the stretch of the Milky Way of which they are a part is one of the brightest in the sky.

Being in the Northern Hemisphere at a declination of about +40°, the area of the nebula complex is perfectly observable from all the northern regions of the Earth, from which it appears visible for most of the year and, north of the 50th parallel north, even circumpolar; this branch of the Milky Way completely dominates the evening sky of the boreal summer and autumn, where it appears practically at the zenith at the northern mid-latitudes. From the Southern Hemisphere, on the other hand, this section of the sky is observable with great difficulty, especially from the mid-latitudes southward; in the southern tropical belt, however, it is fairly observable. (Note: A declination of 40°N is equivalent to an angular distance from the celestial south pole of 50°; which is equivalent to saying that north of 50°N the object occurs circumpolar, while south of 50°S the object never rises.)

A large telescope is also needed to be able to observe the associated nebulosity, and is more readily detectable via astrophotography; it should also be borne in mind that the part of the sky in which the cloud is condensed is largely obscured by a large complex of dark nebulae, known in the northern hemisphere as the Cygnus Fissure or "Boreal Coal Sack," which stands in the way of observer's line of sight.

=== In the precessional epochs ===
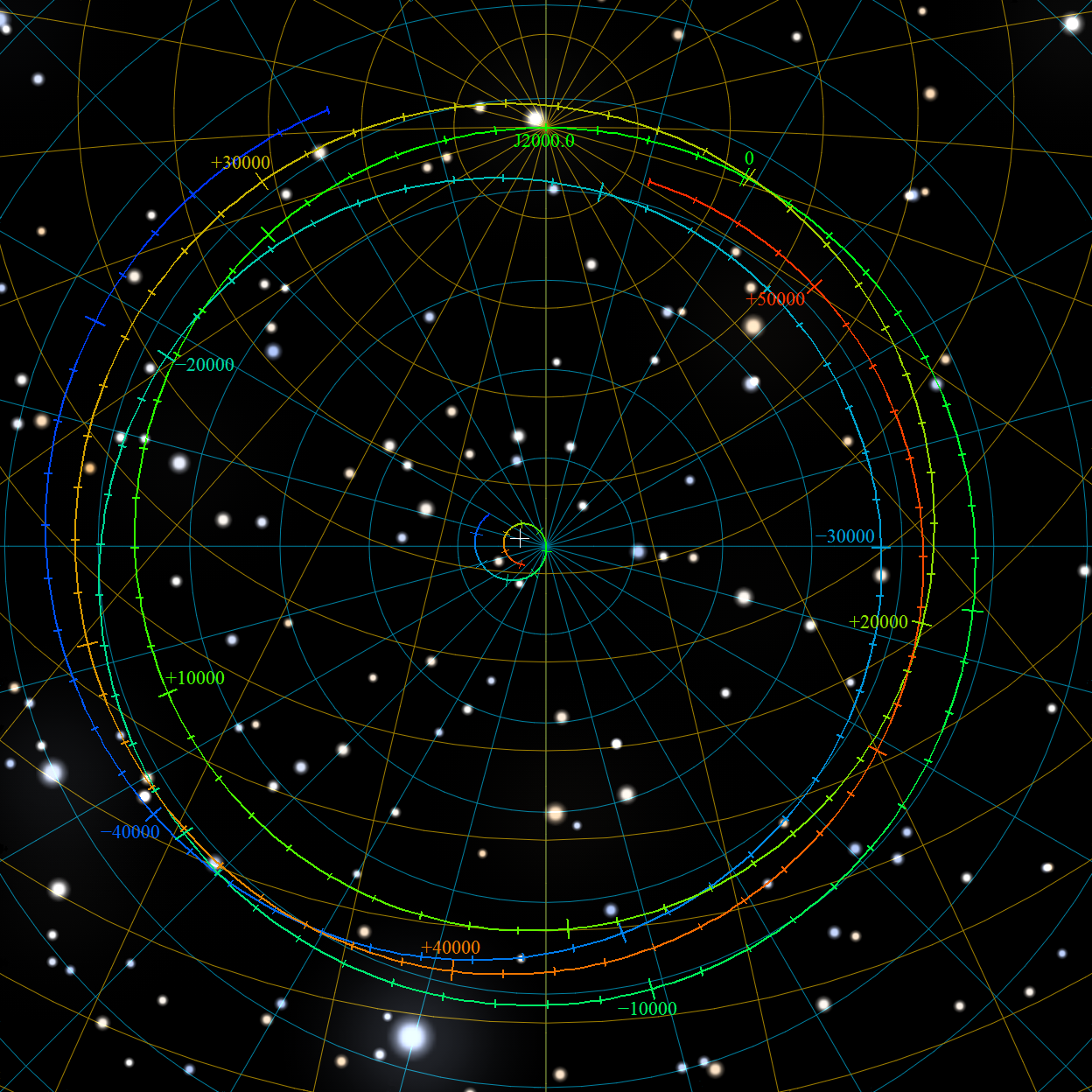
The projection of the North Pole precession path on the fixed sky of epoch J2000.0 for the time interval from 48000 b.e.v. to 52000 b.e.c. The bright star at the bottom is Vega.

Because of the phenomenon known as the precession of the equinoxes, the celestial coordinates of stars and constellations can vary significantly, depending on their distance from the north and south poles of the ecliptic.

Deneb, Sadr, and the Milky Way section of the Cygnus complex are at about 20h right ascension, not far from 18h, which is equivalent to the point at which, except the area around the north pole of the ecliptic, celestial objects reach their southernmost declination. (Note: Just consider that the intersection of the ecliptic with the 18h right ascension equals the point where the Sun is at the winter solstice on December 22.)

At present, having passed 18h right ascension some 2,500 years ago, the complex tends to assume increasingly northern declinations. When, about 11,000 years from now, the complex is at six h right ascension, it will reach its northernmost point: at that time, it will be, as seen in the image opposite, a few degrees from the celestial north pole. (Note: To determine this, it is sufficient to analyze the two coordinates provided by SIMBAD for the vernal equinoxes of 1950 and 2000, whose coordinates are +19°52' and +19°41', respectively.)

== Galactic environment and line of sight ==
The area of our Galaxy visible in the direction of the Swan constellation is dominated in an absolute sense by the expanse of dark nebulae known as the Swan Fissure; this is a low-velocity cloud system that appears, from our point of view, to cross longitudinally across the entire Milky Way south of Sadr for a length of as much as 86°. This cloud is at an average distance of about 700 parsecs (equal to 2300 light-years) and extends for about 1000 light-years. On the edge of this cloud complex are some open clusters, such as NGC 6940, about 2,400 light-years away, and some Wolf-Rayet stars, including the bright WR 147, whose brightness is strongly obscured (it appears to be of 15th apparent magnitude, although its absolute magnitude is -4.7) at a distance of 630 parsecs (2050 light-years).

Observing from Earth in a northerly direction concerning the Cygnus Fissure, two nebulae are spotted: the North America Nebula and the Pelican Nebula; both are at a distance of about 800 parsecs (2600 light-years), thus a short distance from the dark complex of the Fissure. This complex, together with that of the Fenditura itself, is part of the same very extensive giant molecular cloud system that separates Gould's Belt the branch of bright stars in which our Sun is also immersed, from that of the large stellar and nebulous Swan complexes located beyond this cloud.

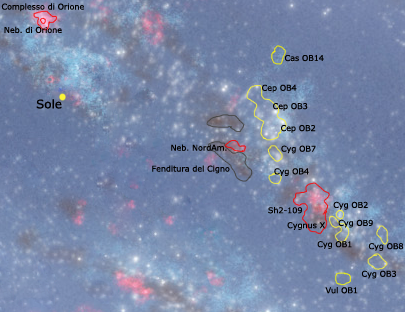
Schematic map of the Galactic region in the direction of the Cygnus as seen from the Sun.

Beyond this dark barrage lie the large OB associations Cygnus OB7 and Cygnus OB4; at the extreme periphery of the large Swan nebular complexes lie a fair number of open clusters, some of which are observable without undue difficulty even with small instruments, such as NGC 6910 and the well-known M29; both are more than 5,000 light-years away. The molecular complex proper is formed by Sh2-109, which constitutes the largest portion and extends its offshoots almost to these clusters, and Cygnus X, a vast complex that is not fully illuminated but emits strong X-ray radiation; Sh2-109 and Cygnus X together occupy almost 450 parsecs in diameter, equal to a good 1400 light-years.

On the edge that from Earth appears to be the "southern" edge of the complex, at a distance of 5100 light-years, lies another easily observable open cluster, NGC 6871; In the sector of the complex located in the opposite direction of our line of sight, however, lie some of the brightest OB associations: This is the case with the "southernmost" Cygnus OB1 association, Cygnus OB9, and especially the very bright Cygnus OB2, which contains some of the brightest known stars within the Milky Way Galaxy, most notably Cygnus OB2-12.

Continuing further, thus moving beyond the complex and into the more remote areas known in this Galactic sector, there are two more brilliant OB associations, Cygnus OB3 and Cygnus OB8, to which is added an open cluster observable with difficulty, NGC 6819, all of which are somewhat detached from the line of sight of the complex; the distance of all these objects is around 7700 light-years. At a similar distance but in a different direction, just northwest of Deneb as seen from Earth, there is finally another H II region, known as Sh2-115, ionized by the bright stars of the Berkeley 90 cluster, which contains 4400 solar masses of gas and dust in about 110 light-years in diameter.

== Structure ==
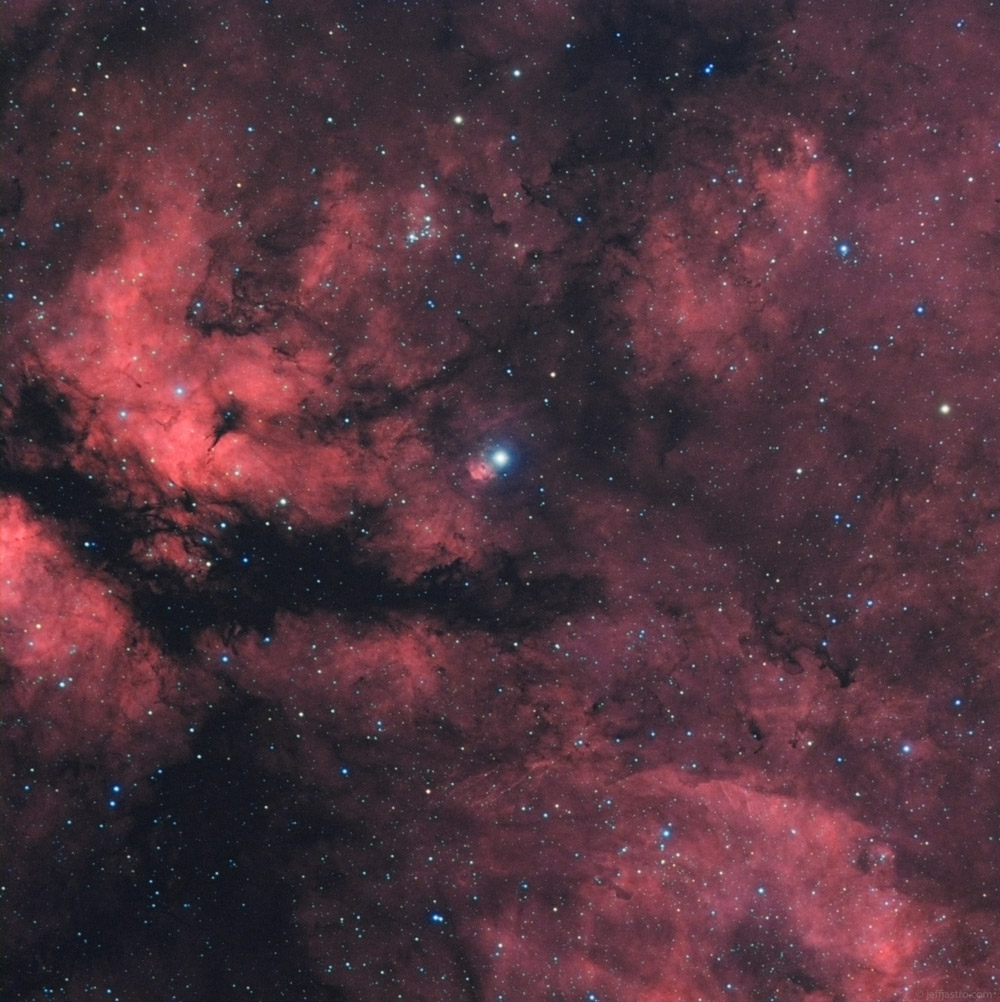
IC 1318, the brightest nebula complex in the Swan molecular region, is visible near Sadr. Credit: CAST

The molecular complex, as seen, is located at a distance of about 5,000 light-years from the Earth, in the direction of a very rich section of the Milky Way; it is possible to distinguish a few different areas, all part of the same complex: the two main ones are the vast extension called Cygnus X and the set of H II regions known as Sh2-109. The former comprises the largest structure, which permeates the large OB associations found in this area, while the latter is a system of dense nebulae in which star formation is active. The Cygnus X area is heavily obscured by the dark complex of the Fissure, which overlaps our line of sight and almost completely masks both the large H II regions and the very bright star fields of the various young star associations.

A total of as many as 159 distinct clouds have been identified overall, of which various characteristics such as density, size, and mass are known; in addition, there are seven large H II regions, three supernova remnants, 45 T Tauri stars, 18 molecular jets, and as many as 215 infrared radiation sources, coincident with young stellar objects and protostars, probably associated with the molecular clouds.

=== IC 1318 ===
One of the densest and most easily observable structures is formed by the nebula system of IC 1318 (Sh2-108); in photographs it shows itself as a collection of nebulae more or less surrounding the star Sadr and more or less detached from each other, to the point that they have been classified as separate nebulae: in fact, they are numbered from IC 1318a to IC 1318e, going from west to east. What makes the nebula bright is not, as it may seem, the star Sadr since it is not related to the molecular complex: although it is a very distant star, located around 1,500 light-years from Earth, it is the foreground compared to the nebulous field.

The most intense directly observable part is precisely the section of IC 1318 visible near the LDN 889 dark band; the westernmost parts, on the other hand, appear more rarefied and filamentary, which would suggest that this part was formed by one or more supernovae explosions.

=== Sh2-109 ===
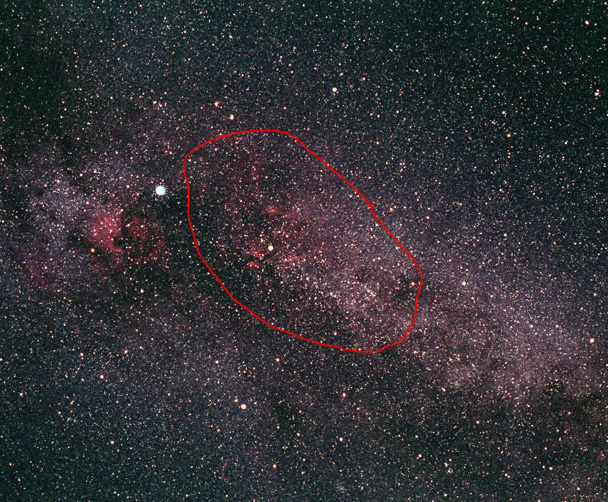
The constellation Swan; the area of sky marked in red indicates the apparent extent of the Sh2-109 complex.

Sh2-109 is a vast and complex system of H II regions, dark nebulae, bright columns of gas, and associations of young stars. The area of sky in which it is located is visible a few degrees south of Sadr, just north of the open cluster NGC 6871; its apparent extent is as much as 17°, which at a distance of 5000 light-years is equivalent to a real diameter of as much as 4600 light-years.

=== Cygnus X ===
Cygnus X has long been considered one of the most structurally complex regions lying on the Galactic plane; it is a vast nebulosity, including within its minor nebula structures and a large number of OB associations. Originally known as a single, prominent radio wave source, it was given the acronym X to distinguish it from the extragalactic source Cygnus A. With the development of observational techniques in the various wavelengths, several hundred radio sources were discovered, up to several 800 in the 1980s; these studies also showed that the central regions of the complex are also the most strongly obscured.

Although there has long been some consensus among scholars on the large-scale galactic structures found in the Cygnus X region, there remains some difficulty in determining the kinematic distances of star-forming regions, as the difference between the various radial velocities is consistent with the dispersion of galactic clouds. The arm of Perseus can be traced by mapping the distribution of the various H II regions and the intrinsically brighter stars; according to these studies, the Cygnus X complex is located in conjunction with our arm and that of Perseus. According to other studies, however, the arm would be that of the Cygnus.

About seventy young stellar objects of spectral class A and B at distances up to 2000 parsecs (equivalent to about 6500 light-years) have been identified in the Cygnus X complex based on the study of the CO, it was found that most of these objects are located within the extreme limits of the Orion Arm.

== H II regions and stellar formation phenomena ==
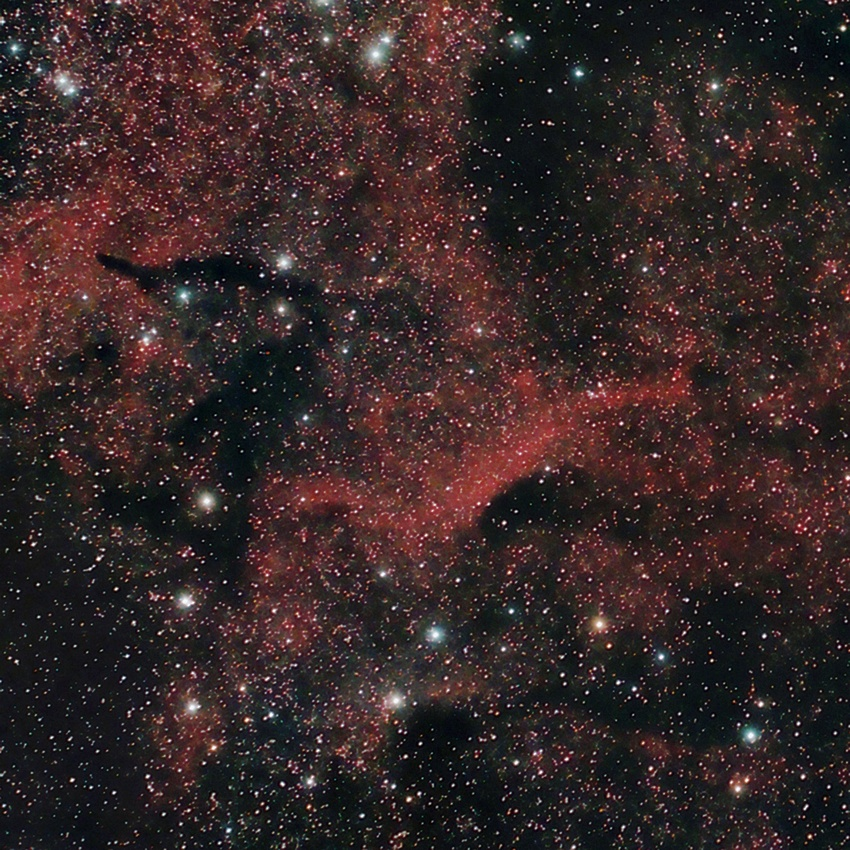
The southernmost part of the nebula complex Sh2-109, with the prominence of the dark nebula B147.

The Cygnus Complex appears to be related to a large number of structures in which star formation phenomena are extremely intense and in which the dynamics of the interstellar medium are quite violent. The area of the sky in which the complex is visible has been studied in various wavelengths, from X-rays to the mid-infrared, to determine its structure: thus, several supernova remnants have been discovered, as well as a considerable number of H II regions more or less adjacent to each other, all included within the so-called Cygnus superbubble. The various individual H II regions that make up the Cygnus X complex are of great importance in the reconstruction of the three-dimensional structure of this galactic region and the study of ongoing new star formation phenomena; moreover, they are an excellent example showing how the various interactions between aggregates of massive stars with the surrounding interstellar medium can create a great variety of shapes and structures, while the fact that many of these aggregates are physically connected within a single and very large complex aids their study.

Based on the method of comparing the elements of stars immersed in nebulae by observation at multiple wavelengths, the position and distance of several observable H II regions in the constellation Cygnus could be mapped with a fair degree of accuracy; one such study found that many of the star-forming areas belonging to the Cygnus X complex appear to be connected with open clusters or extremely young stellar associations. This validates the result of other studies conducted in the 1960s and 1970s, in which it was hypothesized, due to the sparse presence of potentially excitatory stars in the nebular mass, that the complex is in an early stage of its evolution and that the current forming stars are still largely shrouded by their forming globules.

The H II regions of the complex with a mass of less than 100 solar masses tend to form massive stars in an amount up to four times greater than other clouds; the cause for this would be either the high pressure imposed by the ionized gas at the edge of the clouds or the photolytic action of the radiation present in the H II regions themselves, which would tend to disintegrate the molecular clouds. Larger, more massive nebular complexes, on the other hand, tend to be in virial equilibrium, or a collapsed state.

=== DR 21 ===
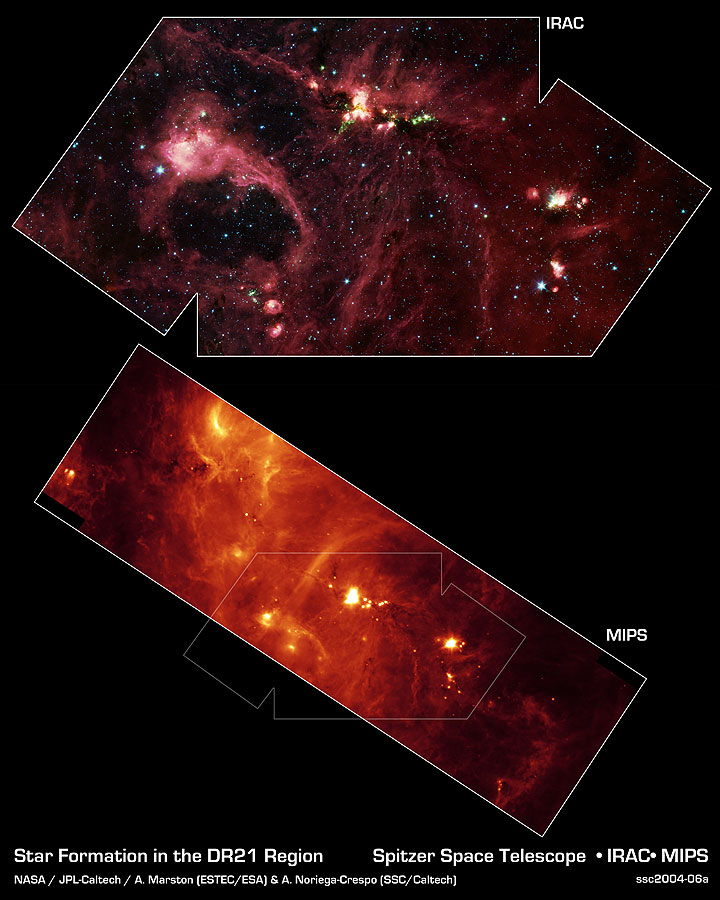
DR 21, one of the most massive star-forming regions in the Milky Way.

Among the individual nebula complexes, astronomers discovered some particularly luminous celestial bodies; the most notable and most studied among them is the luminous DR 21. This complex, also known as W75, contains one of the most massive star-forming regions in the Milky Way; it is associated with a cluster of young stars, and its distance has been debated: until the 1980s, a distance of about 10,000 light-years was indicated for DR 21, while more recent measurements have reduced this value to just 5,000 light-years, thus being in the heart of the Swan complex.

DR 21 would be formed by two interacting giant molecular clouds. The denser and more massive region, located in a central position, may have originated from a generalized collapse phenomenon; hot star formation took place in this area, which thus illuminated the surrounding gases, transforming the molecular cloud into the compact H II region that can be observed today. DR 21 is an extremely young structure, where turbulence and pressures originating from surrounding bodies have not yet altered the structure to cause a slowdown in contraction.

At the emission lines of the CO, bipolar jets are detected, most likely caused by various young stellar objects within it; these jets are among the most powerful and massive (M = >3000 M☉) so far known in the Milky Way Galaxy and possess enough energy to counteract the collapse of the cloud itself and could play a key role in phenomena related to its eventual dissipation. On the outside of the cloud, large filament structures are observed, apparently created by matter ejected from jets, which appear to be interacting with a large bubble, inside which the star cluster is located.

=== Other structures ===
Other minor structures include the ECX6-27 region, which appears to project in the direction of the core of the bright Cygnus OB2 association; however, the negative radial velocity value would rule out a real physical connection between the two objects. This H II region appears to be connected with a vast cooler H I region, which shows, in contrast, the same radial velocity; with a distance of more than 8000 light-years, it is one of the most remote nebulous thickenings in the complex. Instead, ECX6-20 is dominated by a very compact cluster of stars, joined by two others visible only in the infrared; measurements of its radial velocity place it in the middle of the complex, on the edge of our spiral arm. Near-infrared and radio-wave observations show an arc-like structure starting from the compact cluster and extending eastward, while in contrast, a second, much fainter arc heads westward; by analyzing the cluster's position relative to the two arcs, the hypothesis has been formulated that the expansion of a bubble caused the star-forming episode that originated the compact cluster of stars, perhaps the wreckage of an ancient supernova.

== Distance measurements ==
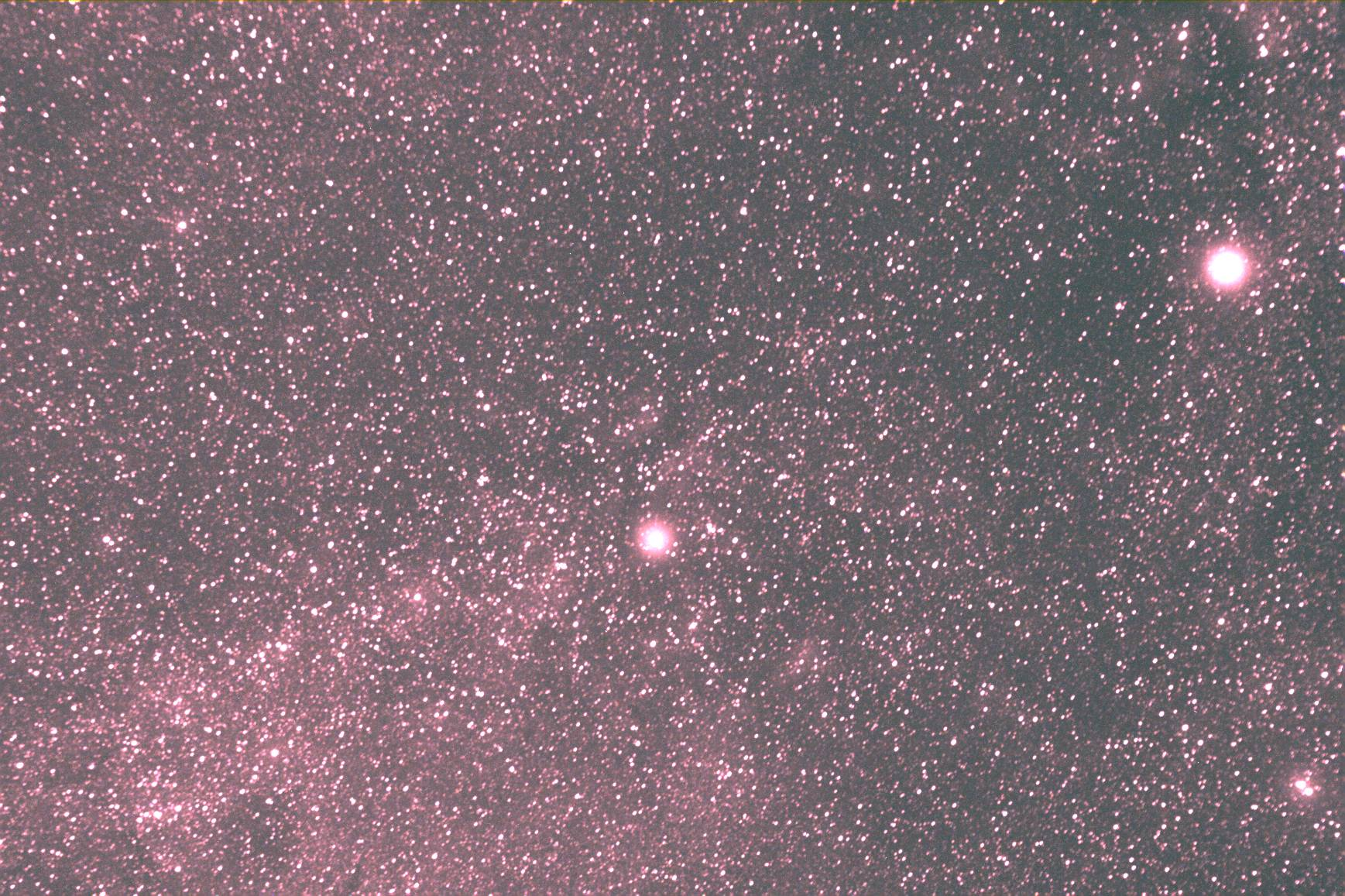
The "Boreal Coal Sack," a dark nebula located between the two stars Deneb (right) and Sadr (left); the center of the Swan Complex lies approximately in this direction and is concealed from Earth by this dark nebula located halfway between Earth and the complex.

The distance to the Swan Complex was summarily calculated as early as the 1960s, exploiting the comparison between the Hα and radio emissions of the brightest H II regions and assuming that the main gas excitation in the region was the brilliant Cygnus OB2 association. Based on these measurements, a distance value of about 1500 parsecs (about 5500 light-years) was determined. Subsequent measurements then confirmed these determinations for the most part.

The difficulty in calculating the distance of the complex is due to several reasons: first, the area is heavily obscured, as seen above, by a conspicuous amount of dust that gets in the way of our line of sight; therefore, the procedure of calculating the distance of a cloud by finding that of its exciter stars cannot succeed since these stars are not always known. The second difficulty is strictly galactic: the rotation of the Milky Way at this galactic longitude greatly alters radial velocity measurements, more so than is predicted in theoretical models, since the change in velocity caused by galactic rotation changes very slowly concerning increasing velocity; therefore, the method of comparing radial velocities observed in nebulae with galactic rotation velocity is not applicable either.

== OB Associations ==
An OB association is a young stellar association containing 10 to 100 massive stars of spectral classes O and B, i.e., blue and very hot; they form together in giant molecular clouds, whose residual gas, once the stars are formed, is blown away by the strong stellar wind. Within a few million years, most of the brighter stars in the association explode as supernovas, while smaller stars, having a lower mass, survive for much longer. It is believed that most of the stars in the Milky Way Galaxy originally belonged to OB associations. Paradoxically, the OB associations of other galaxies can be known more easily than the Milky Way's due to the presence of the dark clouds that mask most of the objects inside it.

=== Cygnus OB1 ===
Cygnus OB1 is an extended association of young, hot stars; it appears to be connected with a superbubble-forming gas system, observable in the far-infrared by instruments such as IRAS; according to some studies conducted at this wavelength, this structure turned out to be very young, only a million years old, and would have been formed through a superposition of multiple bubbles. Its morphology, which is not spherical, is probably the result of the spatial distribution of massive stars in the region. The study of this bubble also makes it possible to reveal that the stars in the association would not have formed in a single star-forming process; in fact, the currently most massive stars in Cygnus OB1 would have formed later than the other components since they are still in the Wolf-Rayet star phase; moreover, the size of the superbubble reveals that it would have originated from the explosion of three or maximum five supernovae resulting from stars with a mass between 45 and 80 solar masses.

=== Cygnus OB2 ===
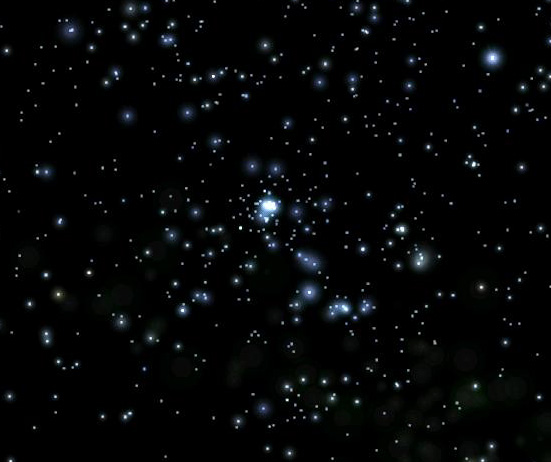
The Cygnus OB2 association viewed with the Celestia program.

Cygnus OB2 is one of the brightest and most concentrated OB associations in our Galaxy; it consists of a large number of blue supergiant stars, some of which are also among the most intrinsically luminous known. Its components are extremely young and show a moderately slow rotational speed.

The spectra of Cygnus OB2 stars and their temperature have been analyzed in several studies, in which it was also found that many of the components are subject to a strong mass loss caused by their strong stellar wind. The percentage presence of hydrogen and helium is similar in all but one star, Cygnus OB2-7, where helium would be present in greater amounts than in the others. Slightly apart from the center of the association is Cygnus OB2-12, a hypergiant star among the brightest known stars within the Milky Way; its absolute magnitude is about -12, and were it not for light extinction, the star would have, as seen from Earth, an apparent magnitude of 1.5 very similar to the apparent magnitude of Deneb, but because of absorption operated by dust the visual magnitude drops to 11.4, thus remaining invisible to the naked eye.

Some scholars, considering the mass, density, and size of the association, have speculated that Cygnus OB2 is an example of a globular cluster in formation: similar objects have been observed both in the Large Magellanic Cloud and in star-forming regions found in other galaxies; it has also been pointed out that this would be the first of this class of objects known within the Milky Way Galaxy.

=== Cygnus OB9 ===
Cygnus OB9 is a relatively unconcentrated association that is observed, from our line of sight, not far from the previous one; in this and the previous one, a hundred or so stars of spectral class O, thus extremely hot, have been discovered. Such a scenario implies that in an astronomically short period (within a few million years), this association could become the site of numerous supernova explosions, assuming that the average lifetime of a very massive O-class star lasts about 1.7 million years, a frequency rate of one supernova every about 70,000 years or so is expected. The distance has been estimated at 1700 parsecs (5500 light-years), comparable with the other two associations.

== Radio wave and X-ray observations ==
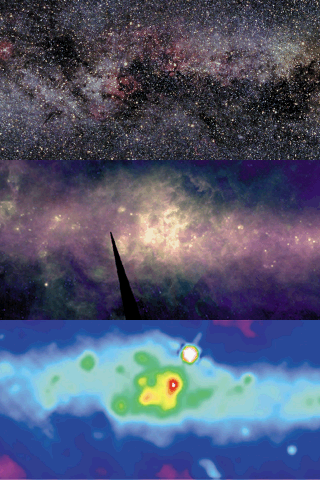
Image of the Cygnus complex at various wavelengths: top in visible light, middle in infrared, and bottom in radio waves (0.4 GHz).

As the site of important dynamical and perturbative phenomena, such as star formation, the region of the Cygnus complex is well evident, and more so than in visible light, to radio waves and X-rays. It appears from radio wave observations that the bright nebulae lying in the Cygnus X complex are in a tangentially observed Galactic region. By observing the radio sources, it was found that much of it is due to high-temperature matter and that its position coincides with that of the optically visible H II regions. Observing in X-rays shows well the structure of the superbubble, a ring structure extending 13°, proving to be by far the largest and most energetic formation discovered within the arms of the Milky Way. Parts of this ring structure have been discovered since the 1970s and have been classified under the acronyms Cygnus X-6 and Cygnus X-7, but their nature at the time of their discovery had not yet been clearly defined.

There are at least two other known Galactic regions that exhibit features similar to those of the Swan complex, such as filamentary Hα emission and OB associations, albeit on a much smaller scale; one of these is the well-known Gum Nebula, an ancient supernova remnant that, however, does not emit X-rays but is well observable in the infrared between the Australian constellations of Stern and Sails. A second structure is the Eridanus Bubble, lying between the constellations of Orion, Taurus, and Eridanus.

As for the Swan region, there are only two known intragalactic astronomical phenomena that can enhance a molecular structure so much: a supernova explosion and the action of a strong stellar wind. It can be ruled out that the structure could have been enhanced by a single large supernova explosion (which can explain the shape of the structure but not the power of the emissions); some scientists have suggested that the energy that occurred to enhance the complex came from the strong stellar wind interacting with the dense interstellar medium in the area, probably produced by a series of consecutive supernovae explosions; in fact, it was shown that the explosion of between 30 and 100 supernovae distributed over some time of 3 to 10 million years could have contributed enough energy to enhance the region to the observed level. However, the progenitor stars of these explosions would have had to be older than those currently forming the Cygnus OB2 association, the most massive in the region.

=== Cygnus X-1 ===
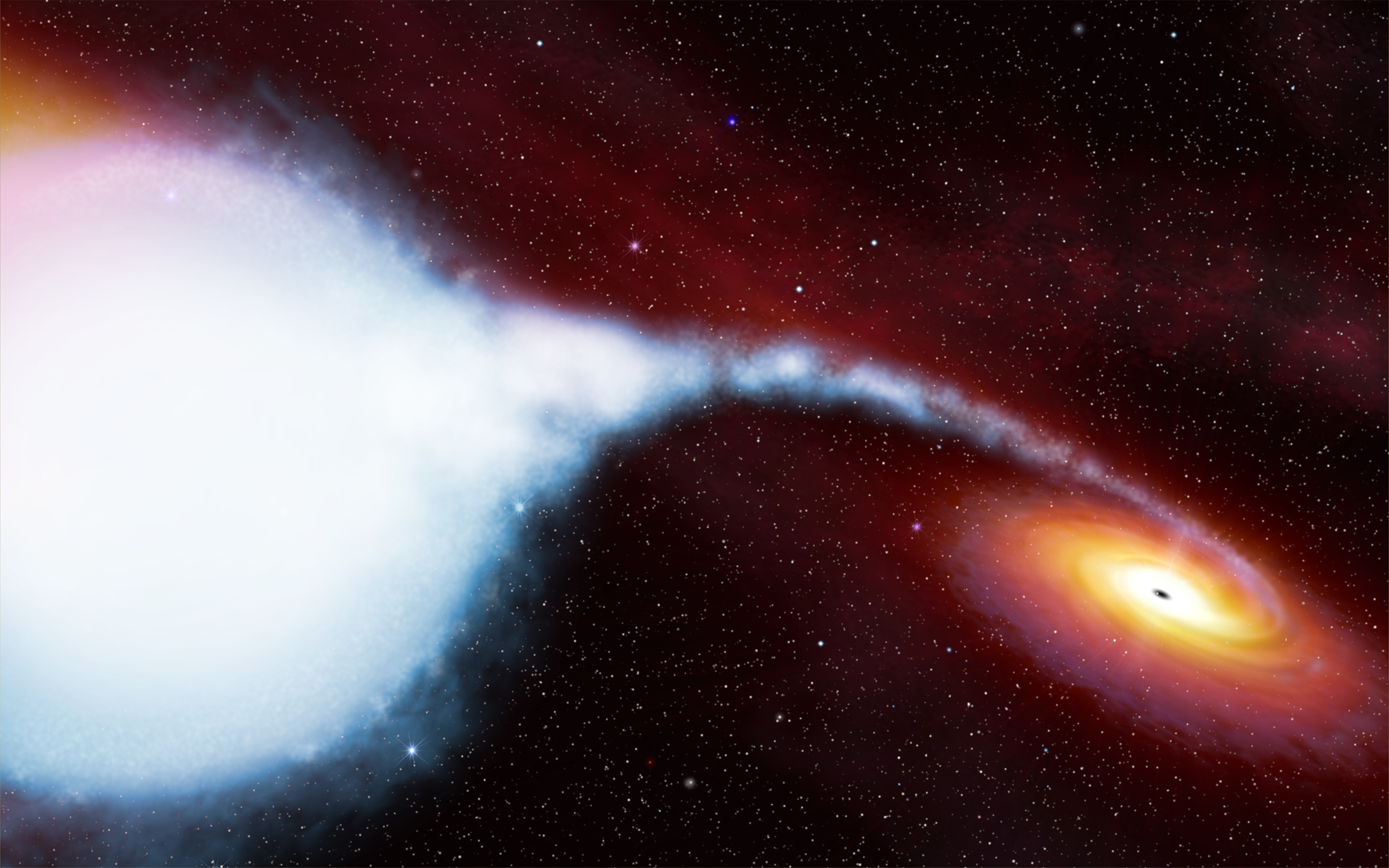
Illustration of the Cygnus X-1 system.

Cygnus X-1 is one of the best-known and most studied X-ray sources in our Galaxy; as a peripheral part of the Cygnus complex, it lies along the same spiral arm where the Sun is located, near the point where it intersects with the Sagittarius Arm. It is most likely a stellar black hole, with a mass of about 8.7 times that of the Sun, and has proven to be too compact an object to be compared to a normal star or other exotic object such as a neutron star. If it were a black hole, the radius of the event horizon would probably be about 26 km.

Cygnus X-1 belongs to a massive X-ray binary system; this system, about 6,000 light-years away, includes a blue variable supergiant cataloged as HDE 226868, whose orbit is about 0.2 AU. A strong stellar wind from this star transfers large amounts of matter to an accretion disk surrounding its companion, the X-ray source. The matter in the inner disk is superheated to several million kelvins, thus emitting the observable X-ray radiation; In addition, a pair of jets emerge from the poles of the disk, projecting matter into the surrounding space.

The system is located, as seen from the Sun, just behind the Swan molecular complex in the Cygnus OB3 association; its age would be around 5 million years, and it would have formed from a progenitor star whose mass was as high as 40 solar masses. Much of the original mass was ejected as stellar wind and during the subsequent supernova phase, from which the black hole would have originated.

== See also ==
- Cygnus (constellation)
- Nebula
- Norma Arm
- Orion Arm
- Perseus Arm
- Cygnus X-1
- Orion molecular cloud complex, a similar but smaller-scale nebula system
- Sadr Region
- Star formation
- H II region
- Superbubble

== Bibliography ==
=== Books ===
==== General works ====
- O'Meara, Stephen James (2007). Deep Sky Companions: Hidden Treasures. Cambridge University Press. ISBN 978-0-521-83704-0.
- Burnham Jr, Robert (1978). Burnham's Celestial Handbook: Volume Two. New York: Dover Publications, Inc.
- Chaisson; McMillan (1993). Astronomy Today [en]. Englewood Cliffs: Prentice-Hall, Inc. ISBN 0-13-240085-5.
- T. Arny, Thomas (2007). Explorations: An Introduction to Astronomy. Boston: McGraw-Hill. ISBN 978-0-07-321369-9.
- AA.VV (2002). L'Universo - Grande enciclopedia dell'astronomia [The Universe - Great Encyclopedia of Astronomy] (in Italian). Novara: De Agostini.
- Gribbin, J (2005). Enciclopedia di astronomia e cosmologia [Encyclopedia of astronomy and cosmology] (in Italian). Milan: Garzanti. ISBN 88-11-50517-8.
- Owen, W. (2006). Atlante illustrato dell'Universo [Illustrated Atlas of the Universe] (in Italian). Milan: Il Viaggiatore. ISBN 88-365-3679-4.
- Lindstrom, J. (2006). Stelle, galassie e misteri cosmici [Stars, galaxies and cosmic mysteries] (in Italian). Trieste: Editoriale Scienza. ISBN 88-7307-326-3.

==== On stellar evolution ====
- Lada, C.J. (1999). The Origin of Stars and Planetary Systems. Kluwer Academic Publishers. ISBN 0-7923-5909-7.
- De Blasi, A. (2002). Le stelle: nascita, evoluzione e morte [The stars: birth, evolution and death] (in Italian). Bologna: CLUEB. ISBN 88-491-1832-5.
- Abbondi, C. (2007). Universo in evoluzione dalla nascita alla morte delle stelle [Universe evolving from birth to death of stars] (in Italian). Sandit. ISBN 978-88-89150-32-0.
- Hack, Margherita (2004). Dove nascono le stelle. Dalla vita ai quark: un viaggio a ritroso alle origini dell'Universo [Where stars are born. From life to quarks: a journey back to the origins of the Universe.] (in Italian). Milan: Sperling & Kupfer. ISBN 88-8274-912-6.

=== Celestial cards ===
- Tirion; Rappaport; Lovi (1987). Uranometria 2000.0 - Volume I - The Northern Hemisphere to -6°. Richmond, Virginia, USA: Willmann-Bell, inc. ISBN 0-943396-14-X.
- Tirion; Sinnott (1998). Sky Atlas 2000.0. Cambridge, USA: Cambridge University Press. ISBN 0-933346-90-5.
- Tirion (2001). The Cambridge Star Atlas 2000.0. Cambridge, USA: Cambridge University Press. ISBN 0-521-80084-6.

=== Scientific Publications ===
- Harris, S. (1980). "Location of HII regions in molecular clouds". Giant Molecular Clouds in the Galaxy; Proceedings of the Third Gregynog Astrophysics Workshop: 201–206. Bibcode:1980gmcg.work..201H. doi:10.1016/B978-0-08-023068-9.50023-3. ISBN 978-0-08-023068-9.
- Dame, T.M. (1985). "A wide-latitude CO survey of molecular clouds in the northern Milky Way". Astrophysical Journal. 297: 751–765. Bibcode:1985ApJ...297..751D. doi:10.1086/163573.
- Dobashi; Kazuhito; Bernard; Jean-Phillipe; Yonekura; Yoshinori; Fukui; Yasuo (1994). "Molecular clouds in Cygnus. 1: A large-scale CO survey". Astrophysical Journal Supplement Series. 95 (2): 419–456. Bibcode:1994ApJS...95..419D. doi:10.1086/192106. ISSN 0067-0049.
- Dobashi; Kazuhito; Bernard; Jean-Phillipe; Yonekura; Yoshinori; Fukui; Yasuo (1996). "Molecular Clouds in Cygnus. 2: Statistical Studies of Star-forming Regions". Astrophysical Journal Supplement Series. 466: 282. Bibcode:1996ApJ...466..282D. doi:10.1086/177509.
- Blitz, L.; Fich, M.; Stark, A.A. (1982). "Catalog of CO radial velocities toward galactic H II regions". Astrophysical Journal Supplement Series. 49: 183–206. Bibcode:1982ApJS...49..183B. doi:10.1086/190795.
- Felli, M.; Harten, R.H. (1981). "A high-resolution search for small-scale structure in Sharpless H II regions at 4.995 GHz. II - General properties of the entire sample. III - Description of selected sources". Astronomy and Astrophysics. 100: 28–58. Bibcode:1981A&A...100...28F.
- Odenwald, Sten F; Schwartz, Phill R. (1993). "An IRAS survey of star-forming regions toward Cygnus". Astrophysical Journal. 405 (2): 706–719. Bibcode:1993ApJ...405..706O. doi:10.1086/172398.
- Marston, A.P.; Reach, W.T.; Noriega-Crespo, A.; Rho, J.; Smith, H.A.; Melnick, G.; Fazio, G.; Rieke, G.; Carey, S.; Rebull, L.; Muzerolle, J.; Egami, E.; Watson, D. M.; Pipher, J. L.; Latter, W. B.; Stapelfeldt, K. (2004). "DR 21: A Major Star Formation Site Revealed by Spitzer". The Astrophysical Journal Supplement Series. 154 (1): 333–338. Bibcode:2004ApJS..154..333M. doi:10.1086/422817.
- Comerón, F.; Torra, J. (2001). "Near-infrared imaging of compact HII regions in Cygnus X". Astronomy and Astrophysics. 375 (2): 539–552. Bibcode:2001A&A...375..539C. doi:10.1051/0004-6361:20010654.
- Dickel, J.R.; Dickel, H.R.; Wilson, W.J. (1978). "The detailed structure of CO in molecular cloud complexes. II - The W75-DR 21 region". Astrophysical Journal. 223: 840–853. Bibcode:1978ApJ...223..840D. doi:10.1086/156317. hdl:1887/6377.
- Saken, Jon M.; Shull, J.M.; Garmany, Catharine D.; Nichols-Bohlin, Joy; Fesen, Robert A. (1992). "An infrared supershell surrounding the Cygnus OB1 association". Astrophysical Journal. 397 (2): 537–541. Bibcode:1992ApJ...397..537S. doi:10.1086/171810.
- Herrero, A.; Puls, J.; Najarro, F. (2002). "Fundamental parameters of Galactic luminous OB stars VI. Temperatures, masses and WLR of Cyg OB2 supergiants". Astronomy and Astrophysics. 396 (3): 949–966. arXiv:astro-ph/0210469. Bibcode:2002A&A...396..949H. doi:10.1051/0004-6361:20021432.
- Massey, Philip; Thompson, A.B. (1991). "Massive stars in CYG OB2". Astronomical Journal. 101: 1408–1428. Bibcode:1991AJ....101.1408M. doi:10.1086/115774.
- Pasquali, A.; Comerón, F.; Gredel, R.; Torra, J.; Figueras, F. (2002). "A new Wolf-Rayet star in Cygnus". Astronomy and Astrophysics. 396 (2): 533–538. arXiv:astro-ph/0210179. Bibcode:2002A&A...396..533P. doi:10.1051/0004-6361:20021373.
- Cash, W.; Charles, P.; Bowyer, S.; Walter, F.; Garmire, G.; Riegler, G. (1980). "The X-ray superbubble in Cygnus". Astrophysical Journal. 238 (L71–L76): L71. Bibcode:1980ApJ...238L..71C. doi:10.1086/183261.
- Gursky, H.; Gorenstein, P.; Kerr, F.J.; Grayzeck, E.J. (1971). "The Estimated Distance to Cygnus X-1 Based on its Low-Energy X-Ray Spectrum". Astrophysical Journal. 167: L15. Bibcode:1971ApJ...167L..15G. doi:10.1086/180751.
