= IRAS 20324+4057 =

Patch of interstellar gas and dust in the constellation Cygnus

Nebula
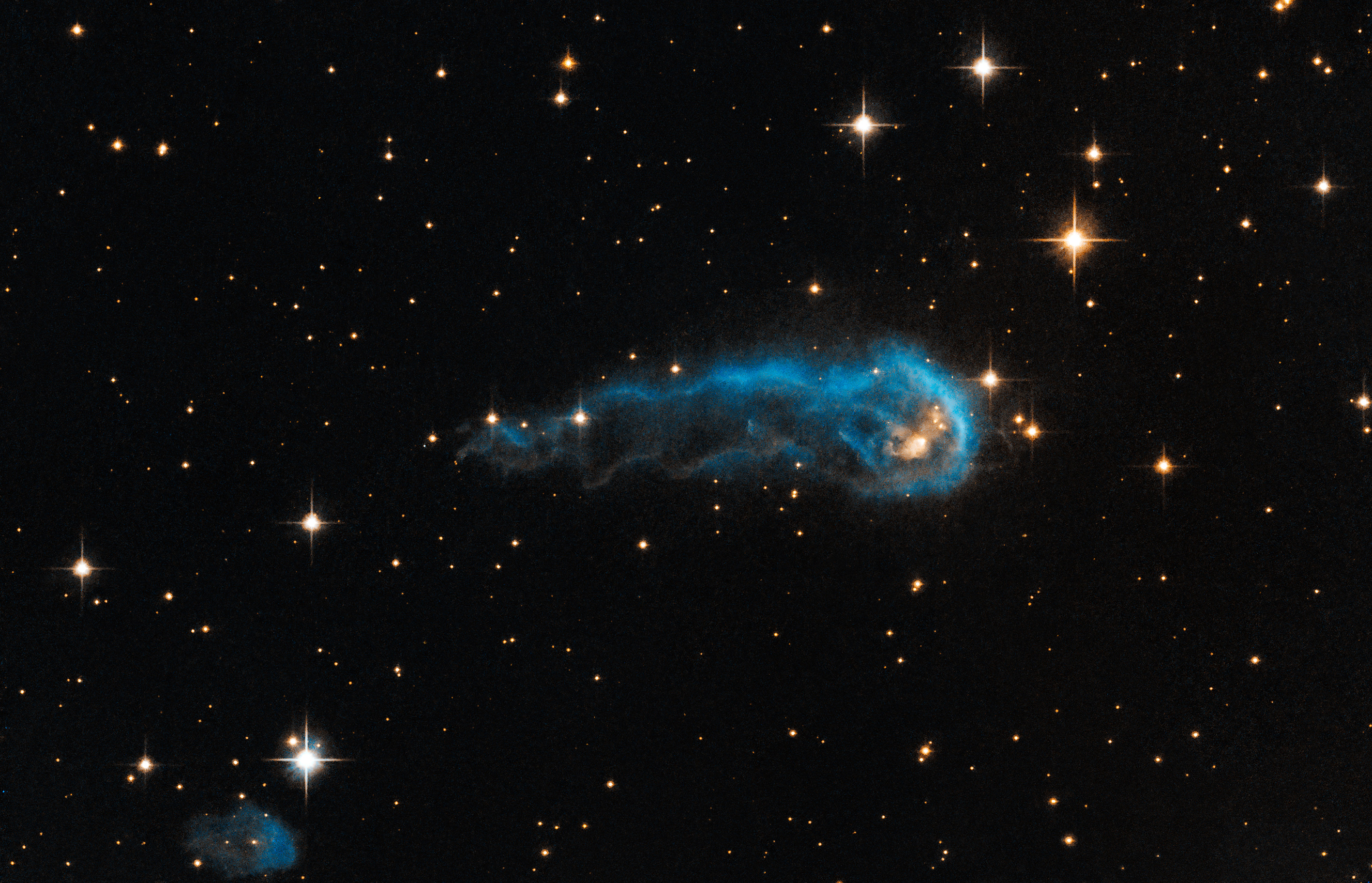
- Cosmic Caterpillar (HST image in green and infrared light)

Observation data: J2000 epoch
- Right ascension: 20^{h} 34^{m} 13.25177^{s}
- Declination: +41° 08′ 13.8973″
- Distance: 4600 ly (1400 pc)
- Constellation: Cygnus

Physical characteristics
- Dimensions: 54.7″ × 14.1″

IRAS 20324+4057 is a mixture of interstellar gas and dust that extends a light year in length in the constellation Cygnus, 4,600 light-years away. It is located within the Cygnus OB2 association. It has been imaged by the Hubble Space Telescope and has been nicknamed a "Cosmic Caterpillar", as it resembles a crawling caterpillar. The head of the object is a protostar, but the presence of 65 O-type stars, which tend to scatter the matter accumulated by the Cosmic caterpillar, leaves doubt whether the caterpillar will survive and mature into a star.
