= PSR J2032+4127 =

Binary pulsar in the constellation Cygnus

Observation data Epoch J2000 Equinox ICRS
- Constellation: Cygnus
- Right ascension: 20^{h} 32^{m} 13.119^{s}
- Declination: +41° 27′ 24.31″
- Apparent magnitude (V): 11.266

Characteristics
- Evolutionary stage: Pulsar + Main sequence
- Spectral type: B0Vp

Astrometry
Distance	4,570 ly (1,400 pc)

Orbit
Primary	PSR J2032+4127
Name	MT91 213
Period (P)	46 years (16,800 days)
Eccentricity (e)	0.96

Details
Rotation	0.14324647 s
Age	201,000 years

Other designations
- PSR J2032+4127, MT91 213, 2MASS J20321312+4127243

Database references
SIMBAD	data

PSR J2032+4127, sometimes abbreviated as J2032, is a pulsar. It is accompanied by a massive Be star named MT91 213 (also 2MASS J20321312+4127243). The system is located in the constellation Cygnus at a distance of about 1.4 kpc (4,570 ly) from the Sun. The system is part of the Cygnus OB2 association.

In November of 2017, J2032+4127 went through its periastron with MT91 213, the closest approach between the two bodies. The passage was a valuable opportunity for scientists to study the interaction. It was the first time this type of periastron passage was observed at multiple telescope wavelengths.

The system has an orbital period of 46 years. It completes rotation period of 0.1432 seconds and is characteristic age of 201,000 years old.
