= W75N(B)-VLA2 =

Protostar in the constellation Cygnus

Observation data Epoch J2000 Equinox J2000
- Constellation: Cygnus
- Right ascension: 20^{h} 38^{m} 36.482^{s}
- Declination: +42° 37′ 34.09″

Characteristics
- Spectral type: Be

Details
Mass	~9 M_{☉}
Luminosity	300 L_{☉}

Database references
SIMBAD	data

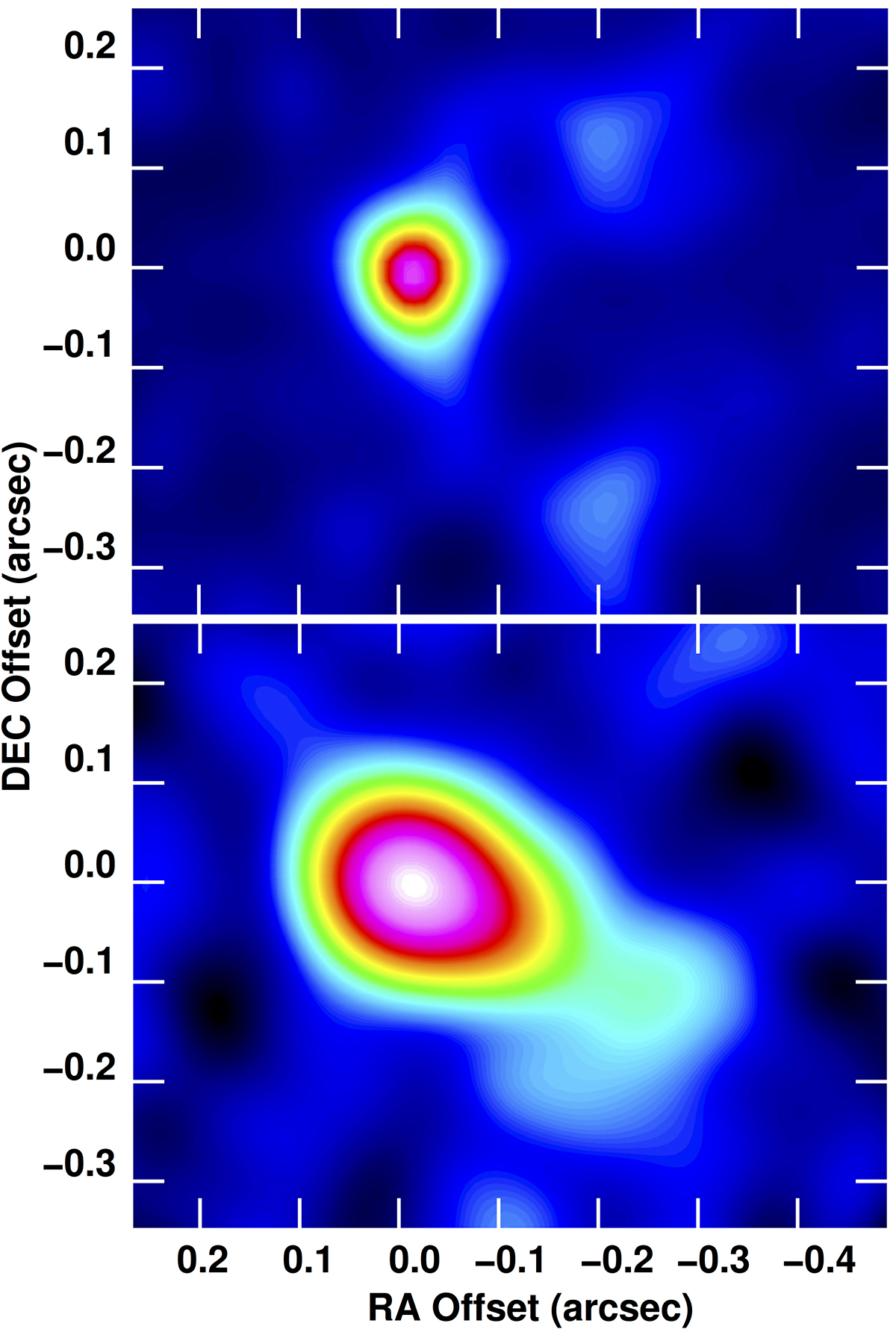
W75N(B)-VLA2 in 1996 (top) and in 2014

W75N(B)-VLA2 is a massive protostar located in the Cygnus X region some 4,200 light-years from Earth, about 8 times more massive and 300 times brighter than the Sun, observed in 1996 and 2014 by the Karl G. Jansky Very Large Array (VLA). In 2014 its stellar wind had changed from a compact spherical form to a larger thermal, ionized elliptical one outlining collimated motion, giving critical insight into the very early stages of the formation of a massive star. Being able to observe its rapid growth as it happens (in real time in an astronomical context) is unique, according to Huib van Langevelde of Leiden University, one of the authors of a study of the object.

The authors of the study believe W75N(B)-VLA2 is forming in a dense, gaseous environment, surrounded by a dusty torus. The star intermittently ejects a hot, ionized wind for several years. Initially the wind can expand in all directions and forms a spherical shell; later it hits the dusty torus, which slows it. There is less resistance along the poles of the torus, so the wind moves more quickly there, giving rise to an elongated shape.
