= Cygnus OB2-9 =

Binary Star in the Cygnus OB2 association

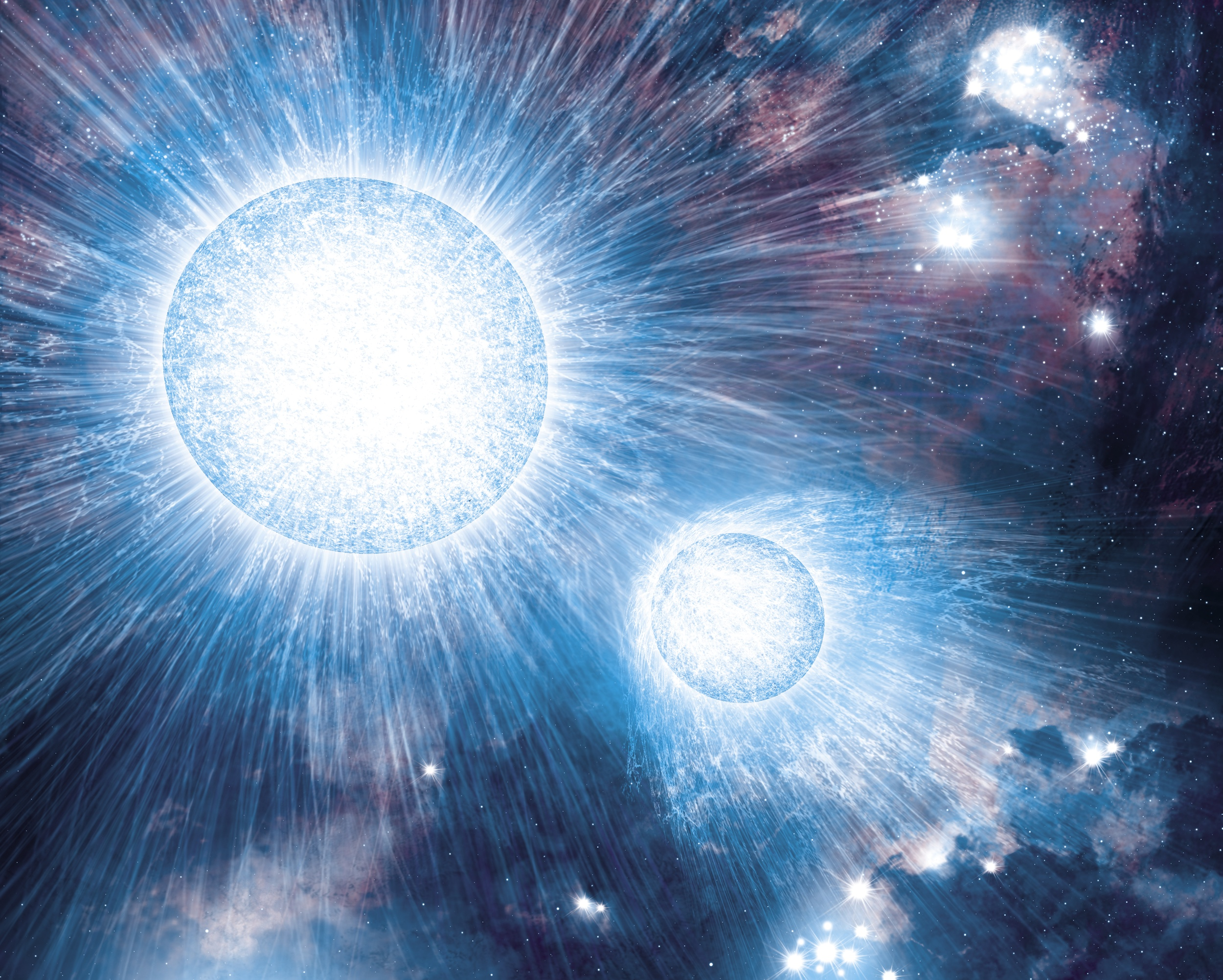
- Artistic Representation of Cygnus OB2 #9 System

Observation data Epoch J2000.0 Equinox J2000.0
- Constellation: Cygnus
- Right ascension: 20^{h} 33^{m} 10.74^{s}
- Declination: +41° 15′ 8.2″
- Apparent magnitude (V): 11.0

Characteristics
- Evolutionary stage: Blue Supergiant + Blue Giant
- Spectral type: O5I+O4III

Astrometry
Radial velocity (R_{v})	−36.9±5.2 km/s
Proper motion (μ)	RA: −2.766 mas/yr Dec.: −4.687 mas/yr
Parallax (π)	0.5214±0.0196 mas
Distance	6,300 ± 200 ly (1,920 ± 70 pc)

Details

A
Mass	~34 M_{☉}

B
Mass	~30 M_{☉}

Other designations
- Cygnus OB2 #12, Schulte 9, 2MASS J20331074+4115081, HIP 101419, 3XMM J203310.7+411508, Gaia DR3 2067783623515353728

Database references
SIMBAD	data

Cygnus OB2 #9 (also known as Cyg OB2-9) is a massive O-type binary star system located in the Cygnus OB2 association, a young and massive OB association in the constellation of Cygnus. It consists of two hot, luminous supergiant and giant stars with strong stellar winds that collide, producing detectable non-thermal radio and X-ray emission. The system is notable for its eccentric orbit and has been the subject of multi-wavelength monitoring campaigns to study wind-wind interactions in massive binaries.

== Characteristics ==
Short narrated video about Cygnus OB2 #9

Cygnus OB2 #9 is a close spectroscopic with an orbital period of 2.35 years and high eccentricity of approximately 0.75–0.8. The semi-major axis is about 18–20 astronomical units (AU), with periastron distances as small as 4.5 AU, leading to intensified wind interactions during closest approach. The binary nature was confirmed through radial velocity variations observed in optical spectroscopy.

== Observations ==
The colliding stellar winds produce thermal X-ray emission from shocks in the wind-wind collision region (WWCR), with luminosities of 10^{32}–10^{33} ergs/second. Dedicated campaigns using Swift, XMM-Newton, and Chandra during the 2011 periastron passage revealed flux peaks following a 1/D dependence on separation, with spectral softening at closest approach. No evidence of radiative cooling is observed, distinguishing it from systems like Eta Carinae.
