= BD+43 3654 =

Star in the constellation Cygnus

Observation data Epoch J2000.0 Equinox ICRS
- Constellation: Cygnus
- Right ascension: 20^{h} 33^{m} 36.079^{s}
- Declination: +43° 59′ 07.38″
- Apparent magnitude (V): 10.06

Characteristics
- Spectral type: O4If
- Apparent magnitude (B): 11.245
- Apparent magnitude (J): 6.636
- Apparent magnitude (H): 6.198
- Apparent magnitude (K): 5.973

Astrometry
Proper motion (μ)	RA: 0.5 ± 1.3 mas/yr Dec.: 2.0 ± 1.3 mas/yr
Parallax (π)	0.6057±0.0304 mas
Distance	5,400 ± 300 ly (1,650 ± 80 pc)
Absolute magnitude (M_{V})	−6.27

Details
Mass	64.6 M_{☉}
Radius	18.8 R_{☉}
Luminosity (bolometric)	850,000 L_{☉}
Temperature	40,422 K
Age	2.0 Myr

Other designations
- BD+43 3654, GSC 03165-00228, TYC 3165-228-1, 2MASS J20333607+4359075

Database references
SIMBAD	data

BD+43 3654 is a massive luminous blue supergiant runaway star in the constellation Cygnus.

== Features ==
BD+43 3654 has a spectral type of O4If with a mass around 65 times higher than the Sun, likely 850,000 times brighter, and very young, with an age that has been estimated to be around 2 million years. Its distance to the Solar System has been estimated to be 1.45 kiloparsecs (4,700 light-years) and it is moving at high speed through the interstellar medium, creating a bow shock.

== Origin ==
Studies of the trajectory and speed of BD+43 3654 relative to the other stars of the nearby, massive stellar association Cygnus OB2 suggest it is a runaway star, making it one of the most massive runaway stars known in the Milky Way (along with the O-type supergiants Lambda Cephei and Zeta Puppis). Initially it was suggested a supernova explosion of a former binary system companion star caused the high velocity of BD+43 3654.

Later research shows that a supernova ejection would not produce such a high space velocity. Given that BD+43 3654 appears to be younger than most stars in Cygnus OB2, an alternative scenario has been proposed in which BD+43 3654 is a massive blue straggler born in an encounter between two former double stars in the core of Cygnus OB2. In this setting, two stars of each binary would collide and merge forming a larger, more massive star (BD+43 3654), that would be ejected from the stellar association along with two other stars. These additional stars would end by exploding as supernovae to leave behind two pulsars. B2020+28 and B2021+51 are identified as these pulsars, as their dynamics indicate they were expelled from Cygnus OB2. A derivative consequence of the latter scenario is that the brightest and most massive stars of Cygnus OB2 would be blue stragglers too.

Another theory is that runaways of this mass and velocity can be produced by an encounter between a massive single star and a close binary system. Such an encounter is expected to send the binary system in the opposite direction to the single star, and no such massive binary has been found corresponding to BD+43 3654.

== See also ==
- List of most massive stars
