= G79.29+0.46 =

Luminous variable star in the constellation Cygnus

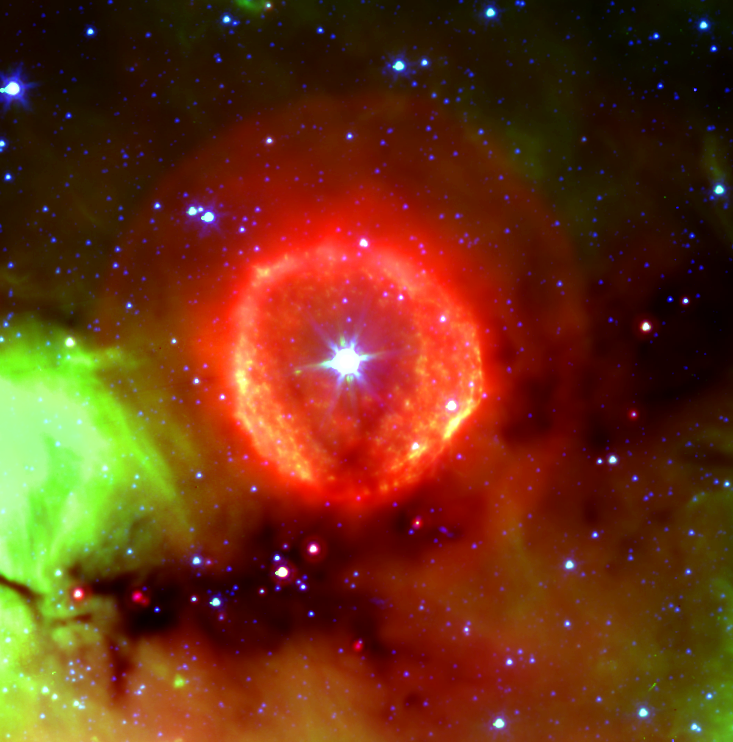
- G79.29+0.46 (Spitzer Space Telescope image)

Observation data Epoch J2000 Equinox J2000
- Constellation: Cygnus
- Right ascension: 20^{h} 31^{m} 42.2847^{s}
- Declination: +40° 21′ 59.074″
- Apparent magnitude (V): 15.1

Characteristics
- Spectral type: B:I[e]

Astrometry
Radial velocity (R_{v})	39.02±7.30 km/s
Proper motion (μ)	RA: −2.925 mas/yr Dec.: −5.339 mas/yr
Parallax (π)	0.5725±0.0596 mas
Distance	approx. 5,700 ly (approx. 1,700 pc)
Absolute magnitude (M_{V})	−10

Details
Luminosity	2.51×10^{5} L_{☉}
Temperature	20,400 K

Other designations
- GAL 079.29+00.46, GRS G079.29 +00.46, HBHA 4203-09, IRAS 20298+4011, 2MASS J20314228+4021591, WISE J203142.22+402159.0

Database references
SIMBAD	data

G79.29+0.46 is a luminous blue variable star candidate located in the Cygnus X star formation region. In the infrared and at radio wavelengths a prominent circular nebula can be seen. This nebula was formed by past mass-loss episodes of the LBV candidate.

G79.29+0.46 was first reported as a suspected LBV by Higgs, Wendker & Landecker in 1993 with the DRAO Synthesis Telescope, which identified a nebula around a star that was a wind-blown shell. As an LBV candidate, it has a spectrum with many emission lines, H-alpha being the strongest. The spectrum is similar to other LBVs and Be supergiants. The strength of the H-alpha line suggest very dense winds around this star. The star is currently losing mass at a rate of 1.4×10^{−6} M_{☉}/year and it is surrounded by a dusty envelope with a temperature of 40 to 1,200 K. The star is considered only a candidate LBV because it has not shown variability in the optical or near-infrared over 20 years. It has been suggested that it is a LBV in the quiescent stage.

From radio and infrared images a detached shell can be seen that shows evidence of two mass-loss episodes. This shell has a mass of 1.51 M_{☉} and a radius of 0.66 parsecs, and it contains carbon monoxide and ammonia.

== Gallery ==
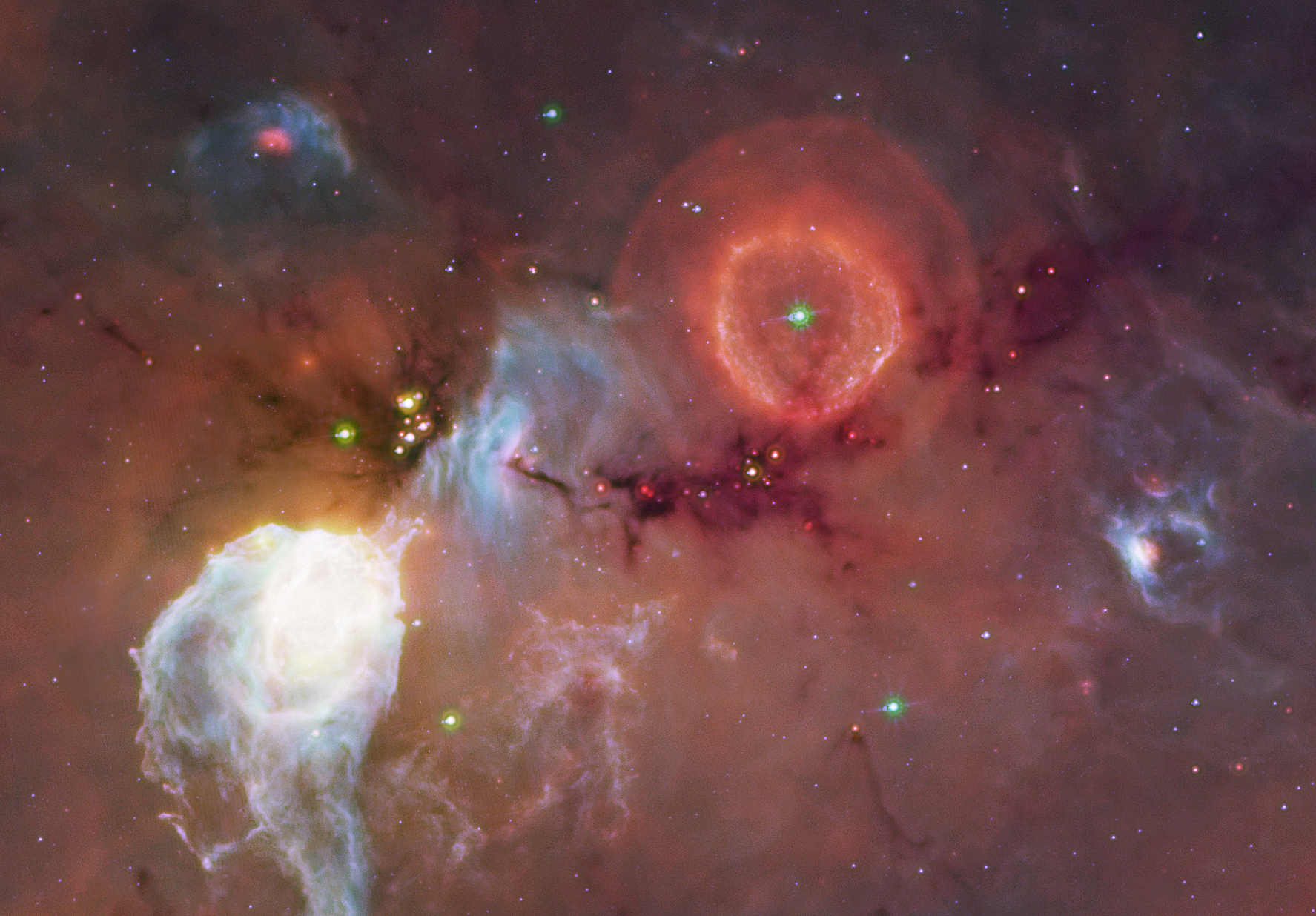
Spitzer and WISE view of G79.29+0.46, the H II-region DR15 (bright object lower left) and the IRDC G79.3+0.3 (dark clouds)

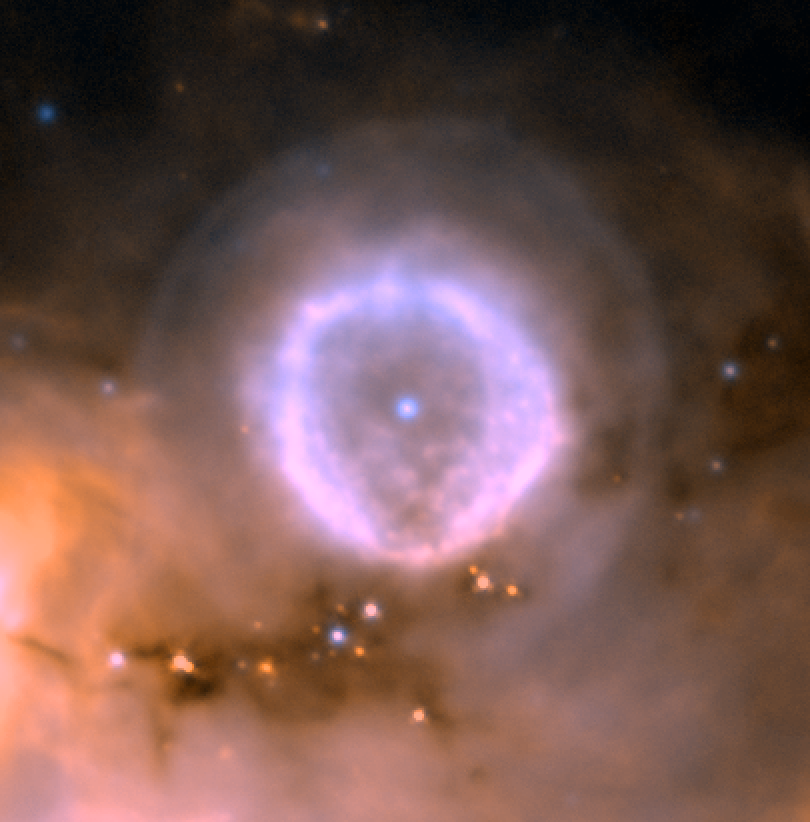
The outer shell is best seen between 20 and 70 Microns, here an image by Spitzer and Herschel.

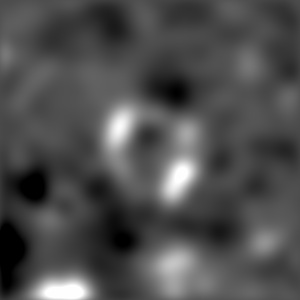
Radio image of G79.29+0.46 at 1.4 GHz
