= BD+40°4210 =

Star in the constellation Cygnus

Observation data Epoch J2000.0 Equinox ICRS
- Constellation: Cygnus
- Right ascension: 20^{h} 31^{m} 04.659^{s}
- Declination: +40° 30′ 56.92″
- Apparent magnitude (V): 10.45

Characteristics
- Spectral type: B2Ia
- Apparent magnitude (K): 4.466
- Apparent magnitude (J): 5.469
- Apparent magnitude (H): 4.833
- B−V color index: 1.68
- Variable type: candidate cLBV

Astrometry
Proper motion (μ)	RA: −3.1731±0.097 mas/yr Dec.: −4.612±0.114 mas/yr
Parallax (π)	0.6530±0.0568 mas
Distance	5,000 ± 400 ly (1,500 ± 100 pc)
Absolute magnitude (M_{V})	−7.66

Details
Mass	54 M_{☉}
Radius	55.9 R_{☉}
Luminosity (bolometric)	630,000 L_{☉}
Temperature	21,353 K
Age	3.5 Myr

Other designations
- BD+40°4210, IRAS 20292+4020, 2MASS J20310464+4030568, TYC 3157-679-1, PPM 60064

Database references
SIMBAD	data

BD+40°4210 is a hot luminous supergiant star located in the constellation Cygnus. It is a member of the Cygnus OB2 association and a candidate luminous blue variable.

== Features ==
BD+40°4210 is heavily reddened and extinguished by the interstellar dust of the Milky Way and little studied. It has turned out to be one of the most luminous stars of the Cygnus OB2 association, with an absolute magnitude of −7.66 and a bolometric luminosity more than 600,000 times that of the Sun. It has been assigned a B1III spectral classification, but with peculiarities including unusually shallow lines and broad emission. Despite the giant luminosity class, the luminosity appears to be extremely high, placing it on or near the S Doradus instability strip occupied by quiescent luminous blue variables. Its brightness varies by less than 0.1 magnitudes on a timescale around 100 days.

BD+40°4210 is located at a projected 4.8 parsecs from the candidate luminous blue variable G79.29+0.46 and probably at a similar distance since both are assumed members of Cygnus OB2; however, unlike the latter which is surrounded by an extensive ring-shaped nebulosity, no nebula has been found around this star.
