= Cygnus OB2-8A =

Spectroscopic binary star near the center of Cygnus OB2

Cygnus OB2 #8A
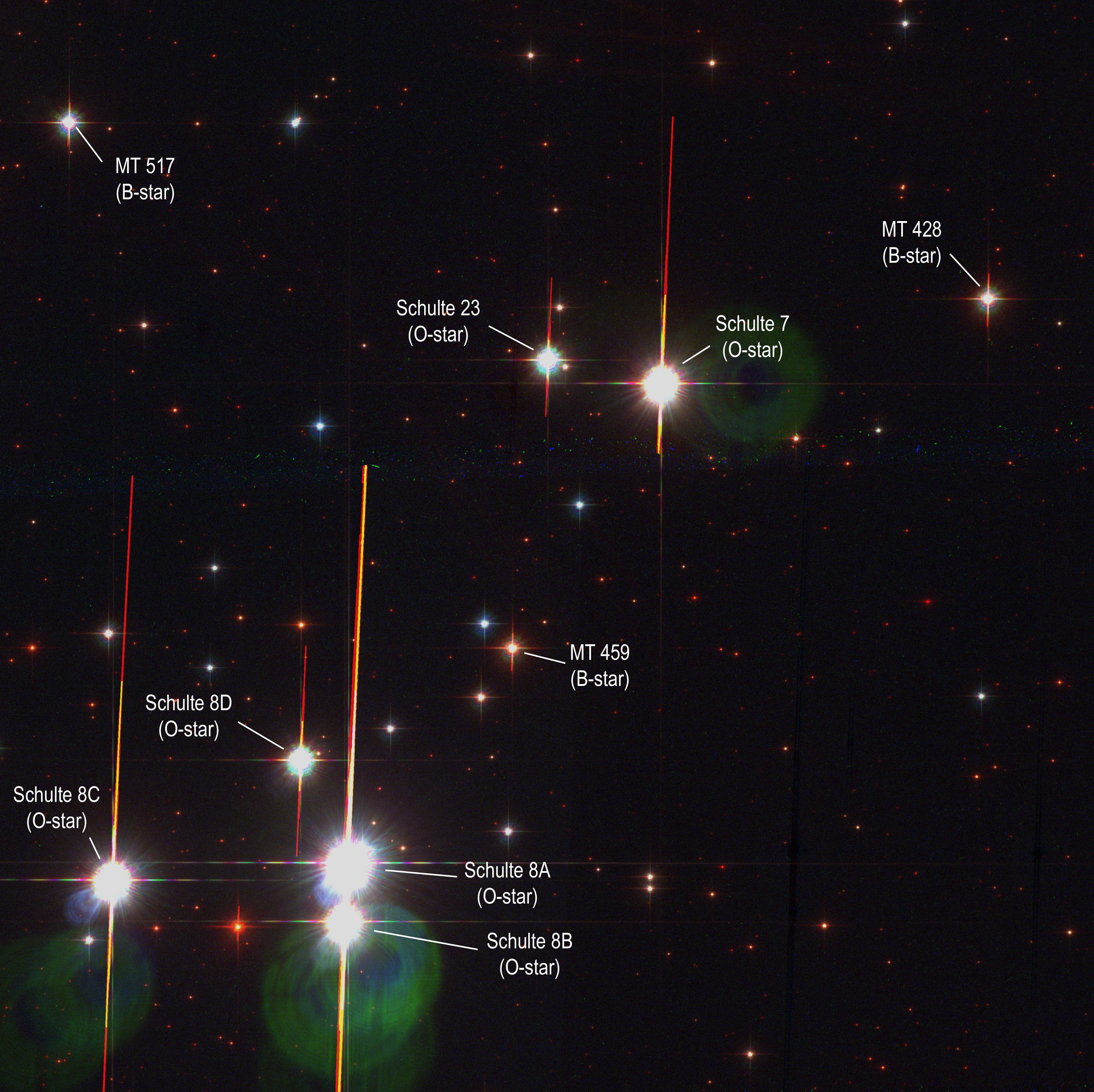
- Cygnus OB2 #8A to #8D (lower left) and other OB-type stars from the Hubble Space Telescope

Observation data Epoch J2000 Equinox ICRS
- Constellation: Cygnus
- Right ascension: 20^{h} 33^{m} 15.07905^{s}
- Declination: +41° 18′ 50.4762″
- Apparent magnitude (V): 9.06

Characteristics
- Spectral type: O6If + O5.5III(f)
- U−B color index: +0.15
- B−V color index: +1.29

Astrometry
Radial velocity (R_{v})	125.56 km/s
Proper motion (μ)	RA: −2.664 mas/yr Dec.: −4.895 mas/yr
Parallax (π)	0.6058±0.0191 mas
Distance	5,400 ± 200 ly (1,650 ± 50 pc)
Absolute magnitude (M_{V})	−6.78

Orbit
Period (P)	21.9 days
Semi-major axis (a)	71 R_{☉}
Eccentricity (e)	0.24
Semi-amplitude (K_{1}) (primary)	82.8 km/s
Semi-amplitude (K_{2}) (secondary)	95.8 km/s

Details

Cyg OB2 #8A1
Mass	44.1 M_{☉}
Radius	20 R_{☉}
Luminosity	650,000 L_{☉}
Surface gravity (log g)	3.48 cgs
Temperature	36,800 K

Cyg OB2 #8A2
Mass	37.4 M_{☉}
Radius	14.8 R_{☉}
Luminosity	468,000 L_{☉}
Surface gravity (log g)	3.67 cgs
Temperature	39,200 K
Age	2 Myr

Other designations
- Schulte 8A, 1E 203127+4108.5, TYC 3161-1325-1, ADS 14000 A, 2E 4382, HIP 101425, UBV 17839, AG+41°1925, 2E 2031.4+4108, IDS 20297+4058, LS III +41 37, Cyg OB2-8A, 1ES 2031+41.1, 2MASS J20331508+4118504, BD+40 4227, GCRV 20036, PPM 60129, CCDM J20332+4119A, 1RXS J203315.8+411848, CGO 605, GOS G080.22+00.79 01, SAO 49781, CSI+40 4227 1, GSC 03161-01325, Gaia DR2 2067784624247057920

Database references
SIMBAD	data

Cygnus OB2 #8A is a double-lined spectroscopic binary located near the centre of the Cygnus OB2 association located 5,500 light years away.

== Discovery ==
Until 1951 Cyg OB2 #8 had been known only as an anonymous catalogue entry in the Bonner Durchmusterung. Then it was identified as one of several highly luminous hot stars close together in Cygnus. Despite being commonly referred to as Schulte #8A, the number 8 was first published in an earlier paper. Schulte identified the grouping as a massive stellar association and split star #8 into four components, including #8A.

== System ==
The Cygnus OB2 #8A system contains two massive luminous O class stars in a 21.9 day orbit. The primary is a 44 M_{☉} supergiant and the secondary is a 37 M_{☉} giant star. The two stars are not thought to be exchanging mass and their luminosity classes match the main sequence turnoff in the Cyg OB2 association at around O6. The nearby stars Cyg OB2 #8B, #8C, and #8D, originally thought to be a single star, are all massive and luminous class O stars.
