= Cygnus OB2-12 =

Blue hypergiant star

Cygnus OB2 #12
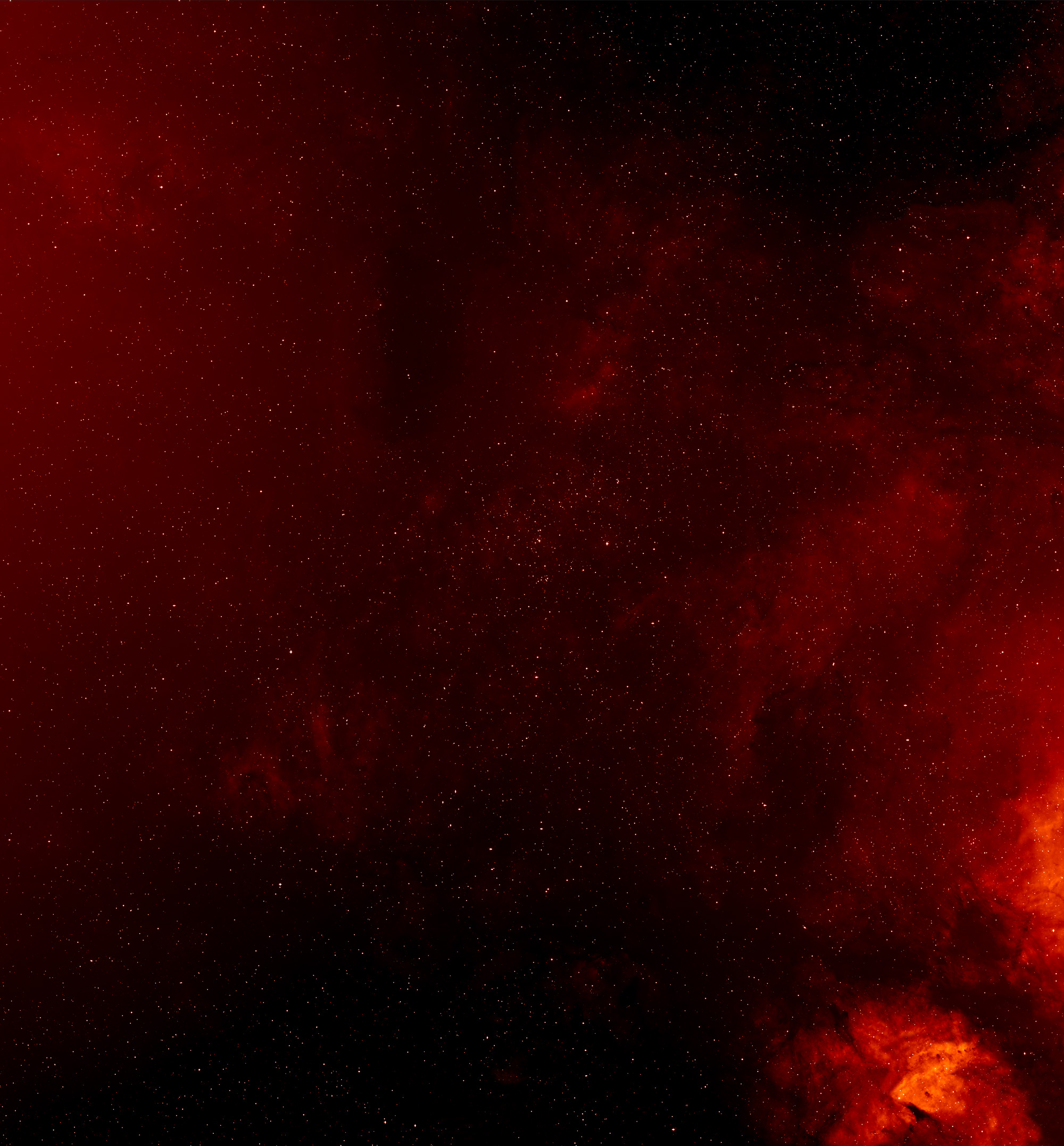
- Location of Cygnus OB2 #12 (circled)

Observation data Epoch J2000 Equinox ICRS
- Constellation: Cygnus
- Right ascension: 20^{h} 32^{m} 40.9572^{s}
- Declination: +41° 14′ 29.279″
- Apparent magnitude (V): 11.702

Characteristics
- Spectral type: B3–4 Ia+
- Apparent magnitude (B): 14.41
- Apparent magnitude (V): 11.40
- Apparent magnitude (J): 4.667±0.324
- Apparent magnitude (H): 3.512±0.260
- Apparent magnitude (K): 2.704±0.364
- U−B color index: 1.69
- B−V color index: 3.01
- Variable type: cLBV

Astrometry
Radial velocity (R_{v})	−11.00 km/s
Proper motion (μ)	RA: −1.703 mas/yr Dec.: −3.412 mas/yr
Parallax (π)	0.5895±0.0518 mas
Distance	5,500 ± 500 ly (1,700 ± 100 pc)
Absolute magnitude (M_{V})	−9.82

Details
Mass	110 M_{☉}
Radius	222+10 −17 R_{☉}
Luminosity	1,260,000 to 2,000,000 L_{☉}
Temperature	12,500 to 14,500 K
Age	3.0 Myr

Other designations
- Cyg OB2 #12, Schulte 12, VI Cygni #12, VI Cyg #12, VI Cyg 12, 2MASS J20324096+4114291, NSV 13138, HIP 101364, Gaia DR2 2067782734461462912

Database references
SIMBAD	data

Cygnus OB2 #12 or VI Cygni #12 (abbreviated to VI Cyg #12), also known as Schulte 12, is an extremely luminous blue hypergiant with an absolute bolometric magnitude (all electromagnetic radiation) of −10.9, among the most luminous stars known in the galaxy. This makes the star nearly two million times more luminous than the Sun, although estimates were even higher when the star was first discovered. It is now known to be a binary, with the companion approximately a tenth as bright. A very approximate initial estimate of the orbit gives the total system mass as 120 M_{☉} and the period as 30 years.

== Cygnus OB2 ==
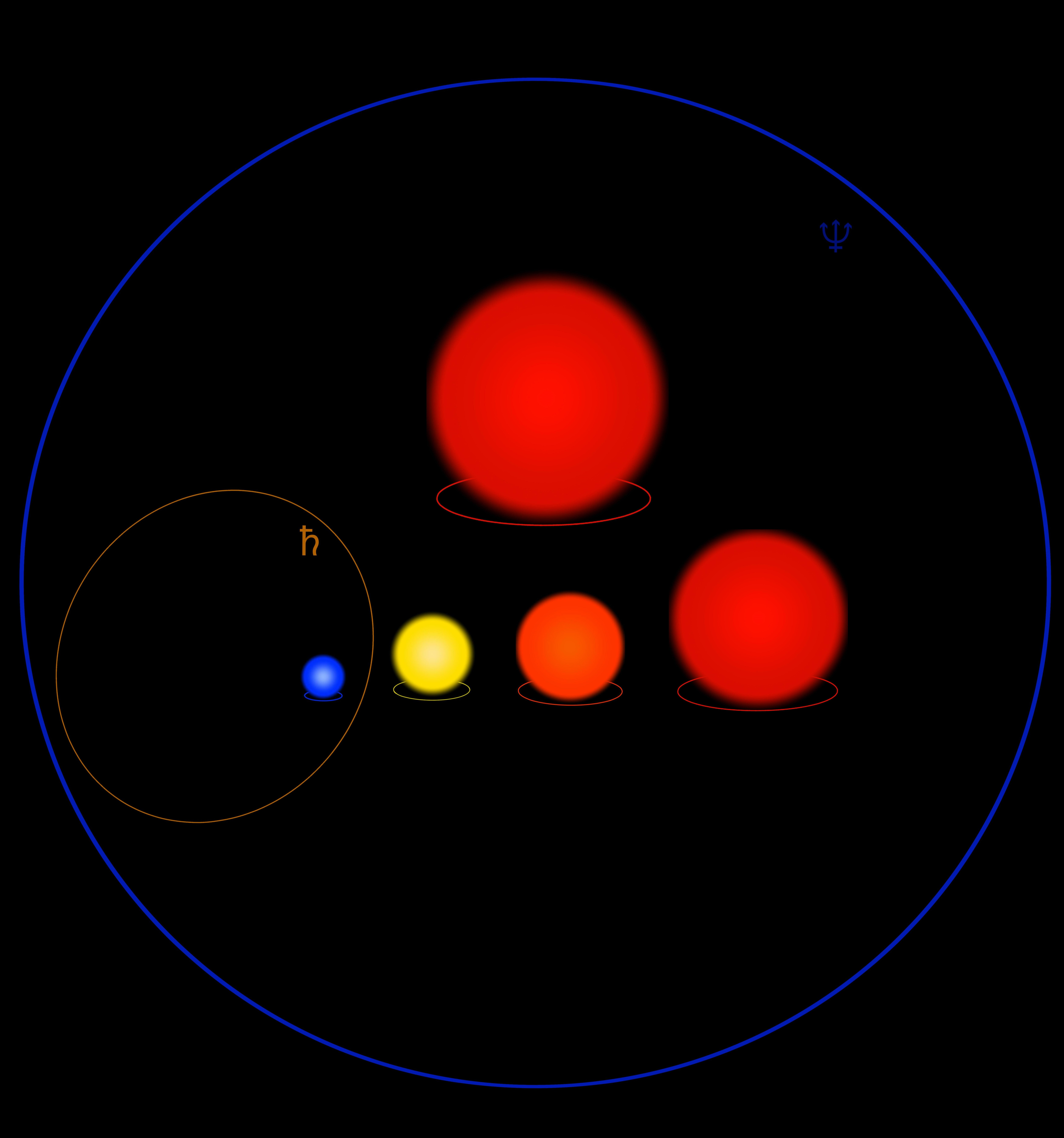
Size comparison of supergiant and hypergiant stars, including Cygnus OB2 #12, V382 Carinae, Betelgeuse, VV Cephei A, and VY Canis Majoris

Cygnus OB2 #12 is generally assumed to be a member of the Cyg OB2 Association, a cluster of young massive stars about 4,600 light-years (1,400 pc) away in Cygnus, and resides in a region of the Milky Way from which visible light is heavily absorbed by interstellar dust when viewed from Earth. The dust causes the star to be strongly reddened despite being an intrinsically hot and blue star, hence it has been extensively studied in the infra-red. Were it not for the dust extinction, the star would have a visual magnitude about 1.5, nearly as bright as Deneb (Alpha Cygni), but because of the dust the observed visual magnitude is 11.4 so that it requires binoculars or a small telescope to be seen.

There are several fainter stars around Cygnus OB2 #12, thought to comprise a small cluster. Two stars are only resolved by speckle interferometry. One is thought to be a main sequence B star in a 100–200 year orbit. It is 2.3 magnitudes fainter than the primary star and 0.063" away. The other is 4.8 magnitudes fainter and about an arc-second distant. No spectroscopic companion could be detected in the spectrum. However, analysis of x-ray emission suggests that there may be a hot luminous companion in a close orbit, with their colliding winds creating the x-rays.

== Distance ==
The Gaia Data Release 2 parallax for Cygnus OB2 #12 indicated a distance around 840 pc, which was inconsistent with the distance of other Cygnus OB2 members. However, the result included a significant amount of noise suggesting that it may have been inaccurate. Earlier measures of the parallax were too imprecise to be meaningful. If the closer distance were accepted then the star would be a more conventional blue supergiant with a luminosity around 440,000 L_{☉}, a radius of 118 R_{☉}, and a current mass of 25 M_{☉}.

The later Gaia Data Release 3 is more precise and indicates a distance around 1,700 pc, more consistent with estimates of the distance to Cygnus OB2, although there is still a significant amount of astrometric noise.

However using the distance provided by Gaia EDR3 it was determined in one 2022 work that the star has a luminosity of only about 316,000 L_{☉}, a radius of about 100 R_{☉}, and a mass much lower than the currently accepted ~110 M_{☉}. This would put the star's luminosity below the Humphreys-Davidson limit. This was not supported by another 2022 study, which still suggested luminosities between 1,200,000 and 2,000,000 L_{☉} and a radius of 222 R_{☉}, derived using interferometry and consistent with radii implied by the stellar luminosity and effective temperature.

== Properties ==
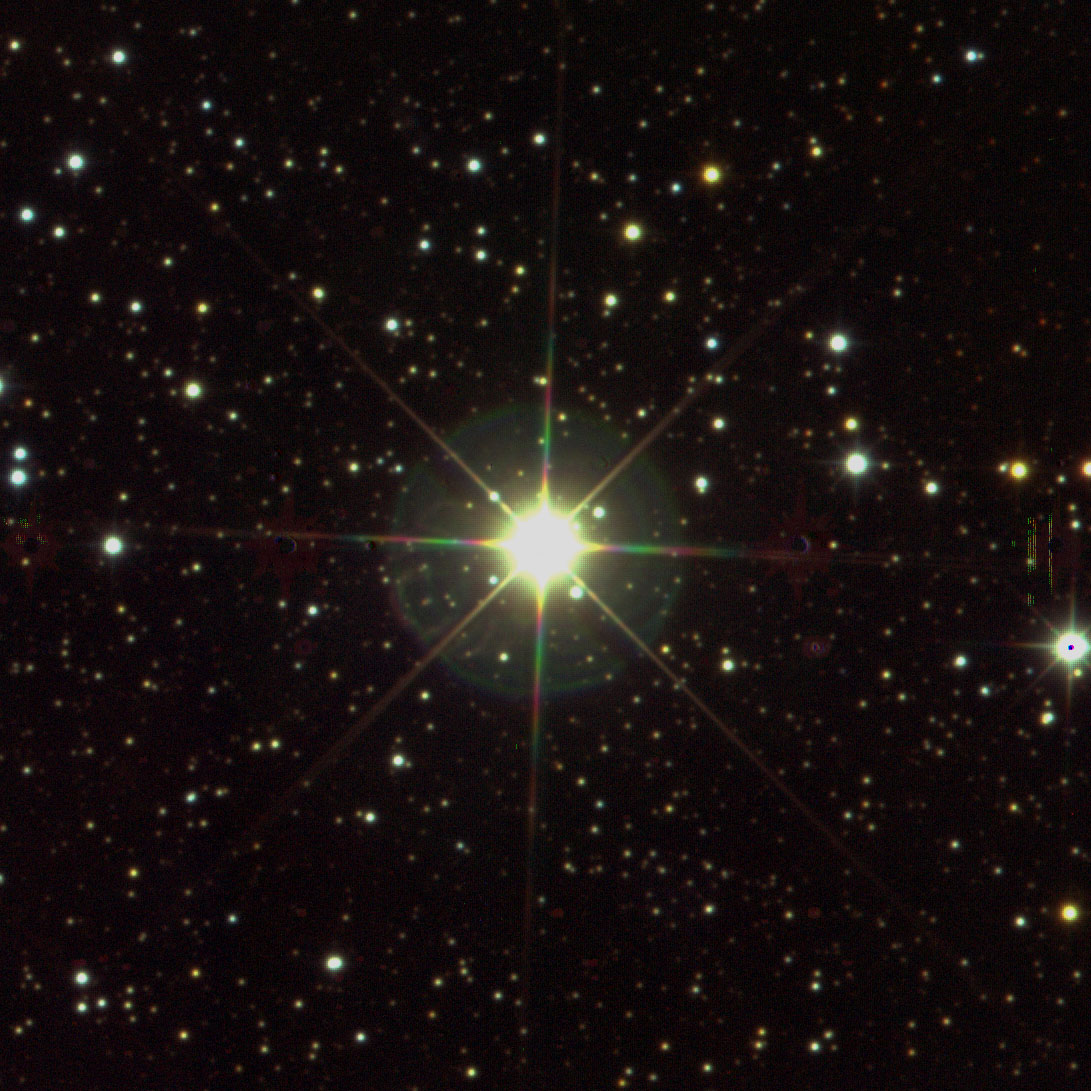
UKIDSS near-infrared image of Cygnus OB2 #12

Cygnus OB2 #12 is a candidate luminous blue variable (LBV). Its position in the HR diagram, luminosity, and spectrum all classify it as an LBV. It shows brightness variations of a few tenths of a magnitude, but these do not seem to be associated with colour changes that would be expected from an LBV. The spectral type has varied slightly since its discovery, but not to the extent that would be normal for an LBV. If the lower Gaia DR2 distance were correct then the properties of Cygnus OB2 #12 would mean it would be expected to pulsate at low amplitude with a period of a few days.

== See also ==
- List of most massive stars
