= Cygnus X (star complex) =

Star formation region in the constellation of Cygnus

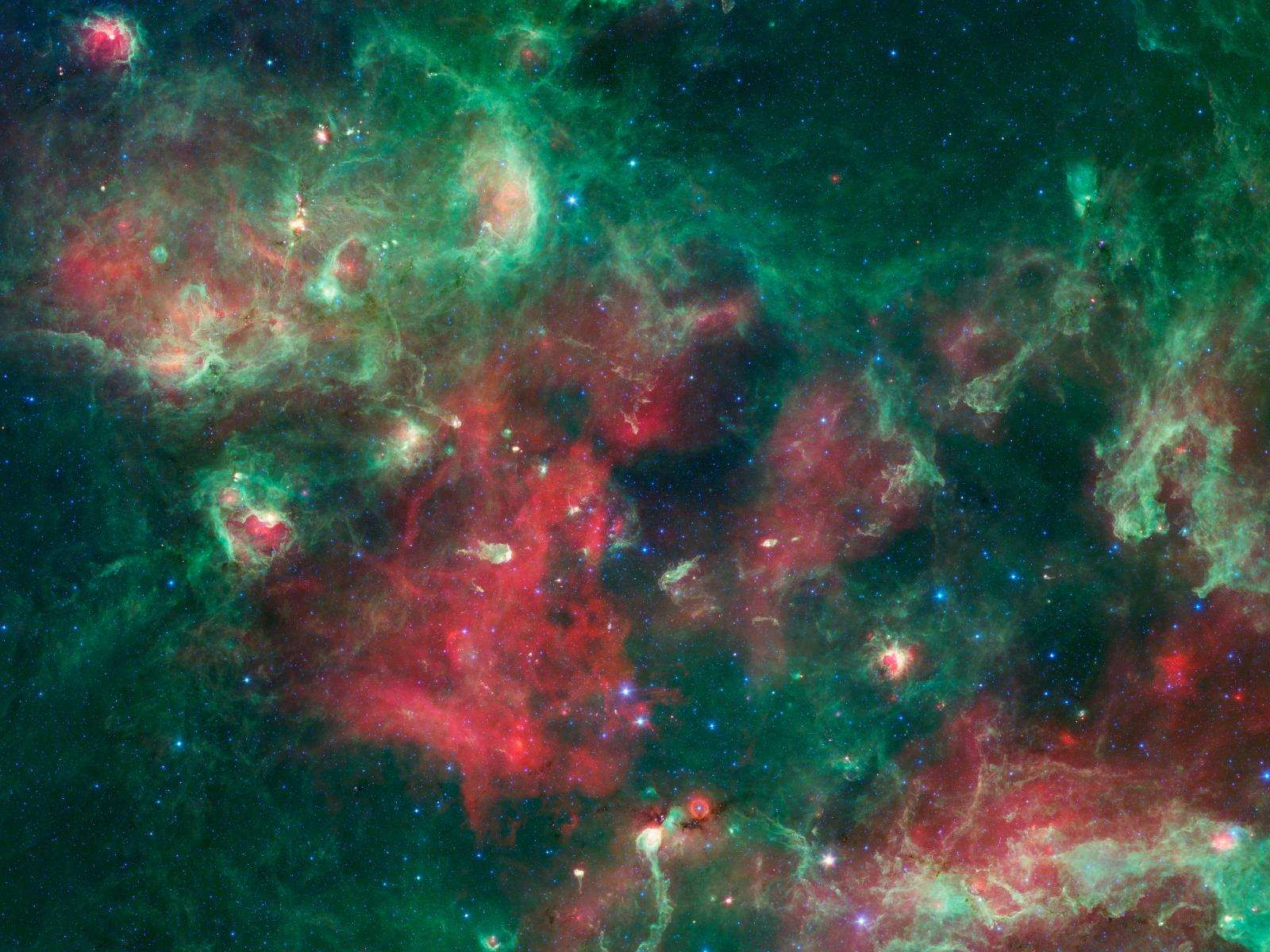
- Cygnus X as imaged by Spitzer Space Telescope
- Object type: Star-forming region
- Other designations: 3FHL J2028.6+4110e, 3FGL J2028.6+4110e, 2FHL J2028.6+4110e

Observation data (Epoch J2000)
- Constellation: Cygnus
- Right ascension: 20^{h} 30^{m} 04.797^{s}
- Declination: +40° 51′ 36.002″
- Distance: 1400 parsecs
- In visual light (V)
- Apparent dimensions: 7° x 7°
- Radius: 280 light years
- Related media on Wikimedia Commons

Cygnus-X is a massive star formation region located in the constellation of Cygnus at a distance from the Sun of 1.4 kiloparsecs (4,600 light years). It has a dimension of 7° x 7°, which translates into around 170x170 pc (560x560 ly), at a distance of 1.4 kpc.

As it is located behind the Cygnus Rift and its light is heavily absorbed by the Milky Way's interstellar dust, it is better studied in other wavelengths of the electromagnetic spectrum that penetrate it such as the infrared.

== Physical properties ==
As studies done with the help of the Spitzer Space Telescope have shown, Cygnus-X has a size of 200 parsecs and contains the largest number of massive protostars as well as the largest stellar association (Cygnus OB2, with up to 2,600 stars of spectral type OB and a mass of up to 10^{5} solar masses) within a radius of 2 kiloparsecs of the Sun. It is also associated with one of the largest molecular clouds known, with a mass of 3 million solar masses. Its stellar population includes a large number of early-type stars as well as evolved massive stars such as luminous blue variable candidates, Wolf–Rayet stars, and supergiant stars of spectral types O and B.

Ongoing research has shown Cygnus X includes two stellar associations: Cygnus OB2 and Cygnus OB9 as well as an additional large number of early-type stars that include BD+40°4210, a blue supergiant star and luminous blue variable candidate that is one of the brightest stars of the association, as well as more supergiant stars of spectral types O and B. The same study shows that star formation has been taking place there during at least 10 million years, continuing to the present day.

Cygnus OB7 lies in its front.

== See also ==
- Cygnus Molecular Nebula Complex
- Orion molecular cloud complex
- Perseus molecular cloud
- Rho Ophiuchi cloud complex
- Taurus Molecular Cloud
