= NGC 6819 =

Open cluster in the constellation Cygnus

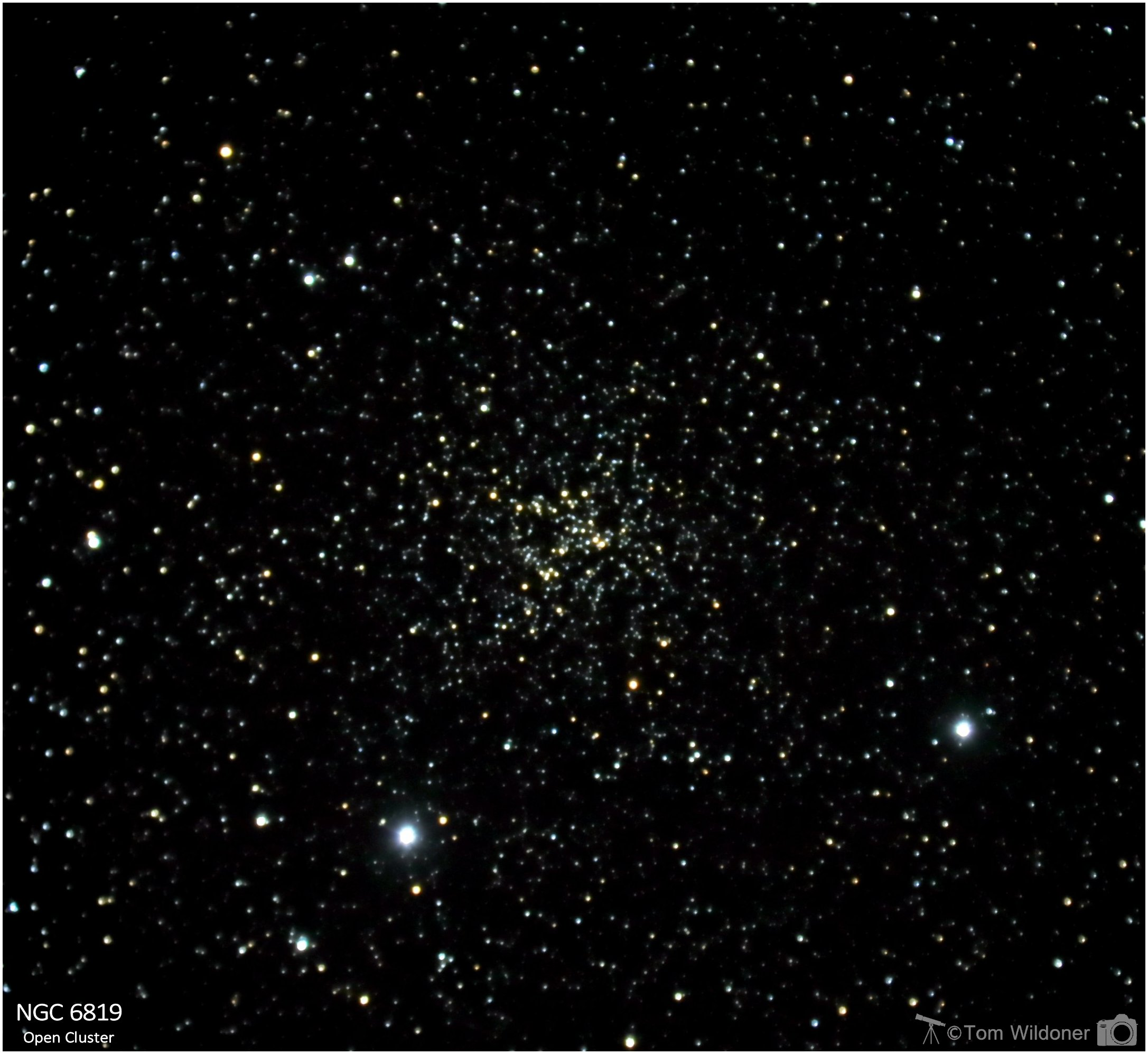
- Credit: Tom Wildener

Observation data (J2000 epoch)
- Right ascension: 19^{h} 41^{m} 18.0^{s}
- Declination: +40° 11′ 12″
- Distance: 7,200 ly
- Apparent magnitude (V): 7.3
- Apparent dimensions (V): 5'

Physical characteristics
- Other designations: Collinder 403

Associations
- Constellation: Cygnus

NGC 6819, also known as The Foxhead, Fox Head Cluster, or Octopus Cluster, is an open cluster (commonly known as an "open star cluster") located 7,200 light years away in the constellation Cygnus. It was discovered by Caroline Herschel on 12 May 1784.

Situated on the boundary of Cygnus and Lyra, NGC 6819 contains roughly two dozen stars of magnitude 10 to 12, with many more lower magnitude members.

The age of NGC 6819 is estimated here to be ~ 2.5 ± 0.5 Gyr. Its distance is calculated to be 2.16 ± 0.57 kpc.

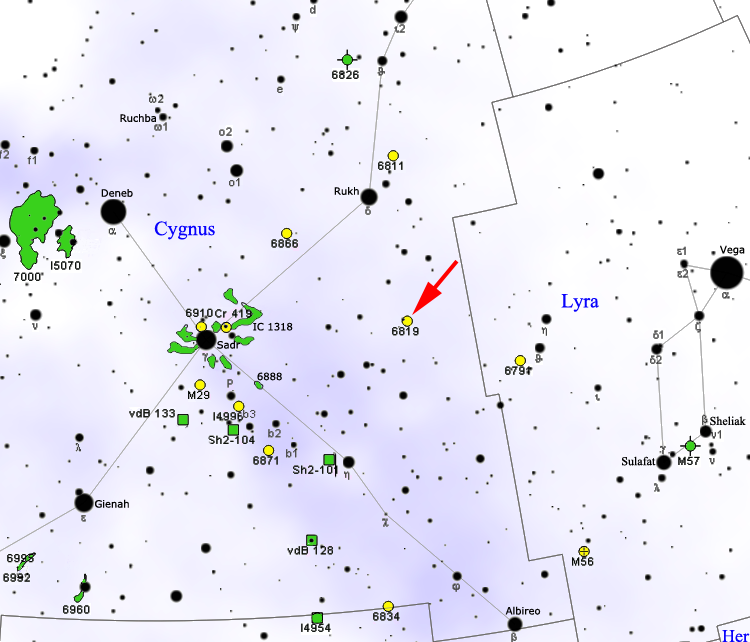
Map showing location of NGC 6819
