= Cygnus OB2 =

Cluster of massive and luminous stars

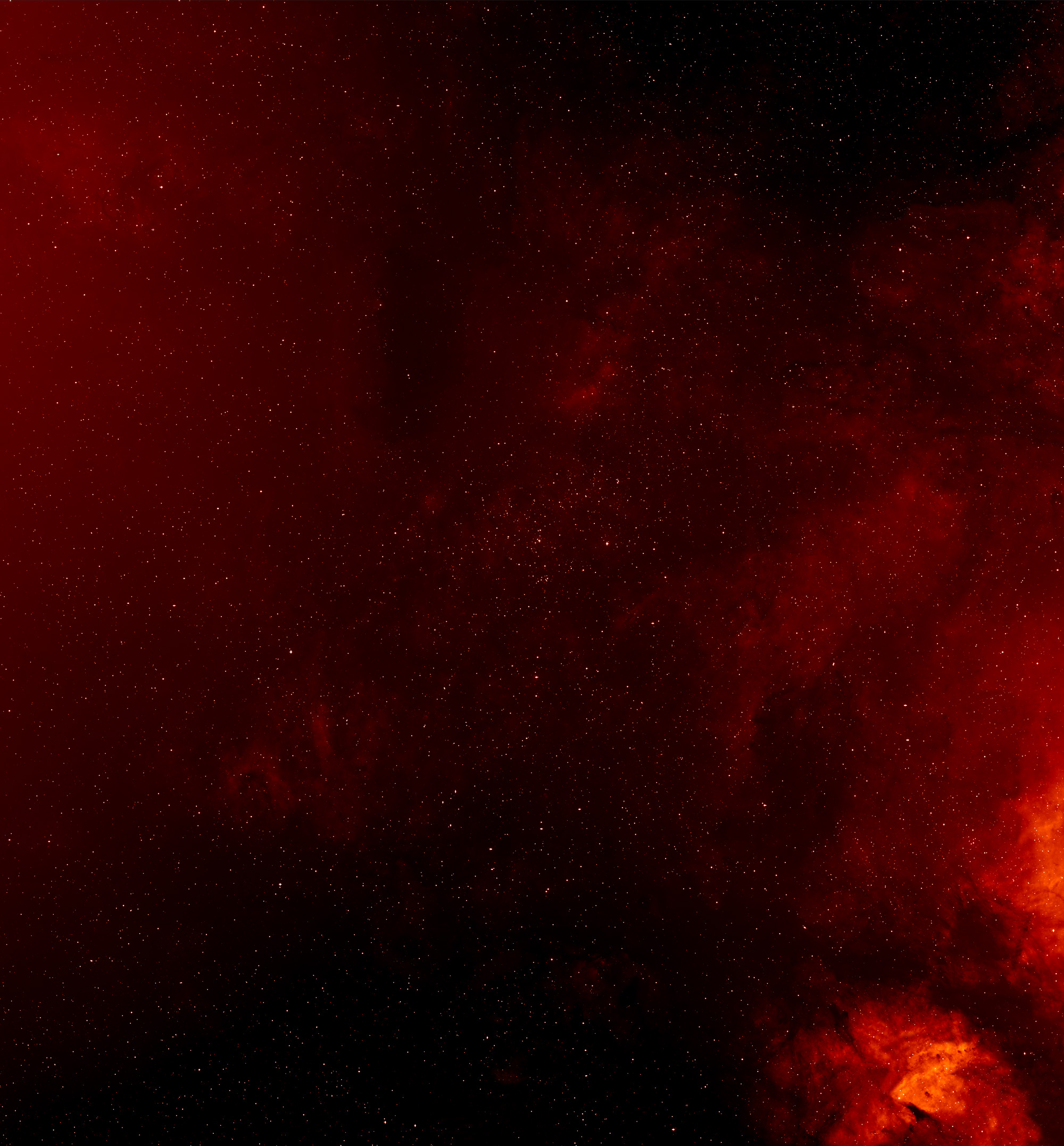
- Cygnus OB2 in the light of H-Alpha; 3.5° view Credit: IPHAS

Observation data (J2000.0 epoch)
- Right ascension: 20^{h} 33^{m} 12^{s}
- Declination: 41° 19′ 00″
- Distance: 5.12 kly (1,570+80 −70 pc)
- Apparent magnitude (V): 6.1
- Apparent dimensions (V): 60.0′

Physical characteristics
- Estimated age: 1 to 7 million years
- –

Associations
- Constellation: Cygnus

Short narrated video about Cygnus OB2 #9

Cygnus OB2 or VI Cygni (abbreviated to VI Cyg) is an OB association that is home to some of the most massive and most luminous stars known, including suspected Luminous blue variable Cyg OB2 #12. It also includes one of the largest known stars, NML Cygni. The region is embedded within a wider one of star formation known as Cygnus X, which is one of the most luminous objects in the sky at radio wavelengths. The region is approximately 1,570 parsecs from Earth in the constellation of Cygnus.

The young cluster is one of the largest known and the largest in the northern hemisphere with some authors formerly classifying it as a young globular cluster similar to those in the Large Magellanic Cloud. Today, however, it is considered a massive, low-density stellar association.

Although it is over ten times more massive than the Orion Nebula, which is easily seen with the naked eye, Cygnus OB2 is hidden behind a massive dust cloud known as the Cygnus Rift, which obscures many of the stars in it. This means that despite its large size, it is hard to determine its actual properties. The estimated number of massive stars range from 50 to 100 of spectral type O and its total mass having been calculated as (4–10)×10^{4} or 3×10^{4} solar masses according to other investigations.

Despite this, recent surveys ranging from radio to X-ray wavelengths have observed the region to great depths to gain a better understanding of how the processes of star and planet formation occur on such a large scale. These studies include observations with the Chandra X-ray Observatory, Spitzer Space Telescope, the Herschel Space Observatory and the Gran Telescopio Canarias. As for recent observations, the final stages of the process of photoablation is taking place, where the biggest stars formed and cleared the ambient material from the region.

Prominent stars
Schulte number	MT number	Other name/CPR number	Spectral type	Luminosity (L_{☉})	Mass (M_{☉})
		HD 195213	O7	180,300	43.3
		WR 144	WC4	158,500	9.9
		WR 145	WN7o/CE+O7V((f))	371,000	18.3
		WR 146	WC6+O8III	115,000	8?+?
		WR 147	WN8h+B0.5V	2,000,000	51
		NML Cyg	M4.5–M7.9Ia–III	229,000	50
		V1827 Cyg/B17	Ofpe	242,100	57
		BD+40°4210	B1III:e	630,000	54
		BD+40 4223	B0Ia	539,500	48.3
#1	59		O8.5V	120,000	26
#2	83		B1I	40,000	14
#3			O6IV+O9III	346,000	>17 + >8
#4	217		O7III((f))	158,000	29
#5		V729	O7I+O6I+O9V	1,584,000	31 + 27 + 9
#6	317		O8V	109,000	25
#7	457		O3If	426,000	47
#8A	465		O6If+O5.5III(f)	501,000	44 + 37
#8B	462		O6.5III(f)	301,000	35
#8C	483		O5If	371,000	42
#8D	473		O8.5V	48,000	20
#9	431		O5–5.5I+O3–4III	707,000	>34 + >30
#10	632		O9.5I	478,000	37
#11	734		O5If	537,000	44
#12	304		B3-4Ia^{+}	1,230,000	110
#14	227		O9V	45,000	19
#15	258		O8V	61,000	22
#16	299		O8V	83,000	23
#17	339		O8.5V	61,000	21
#18	556		B1Ib	338,000	29
#19	601		B0Iab	186,000	26
#20	145		O9III	26,000	17
#21	259		B0.5V	15,000	13
#22	417		O3If+O6V(f)	660,000	50
#23	470		O9.5V	26,000	17
#24	480		O7.5V	104,000	25
#25	531		O8.5V	97,000	24
#26	642		B1III	69,000	16
#27	696		O9.5V+B0V	30,000	17
#29	745		O7V	87,000	25
#30	793		B1.5III	33,000	13
#37	358		B3V	3,000	7
#41	378		B0V	44,000	18
#51	425		B0V	27,000	16
#54	395		B1V	7,000	10
#64	488		B2Ve	23,000	12
#66	515		B1V	10,000	11
#70	588		B0V	48,000	18
#71	646		B1.5V	6,000	9
#73			O8III+O8III	41,000	20
#74	555		O8V	109,000	25
#75	736		O9V	31,000	18
	138		O8I	88,700	26
	267	A11	O7.5III	323,000	35
	448		O6V	107,000	29
	516		O5.5V((f))	707,000	52
	716		O9V	28,000	18
	771		O7V	151,000	29
		A12	B0Ia	373,300	36
		A15	O7I	263,000	32
		A20	O8II	380,000	35
		A23	B0.7Ib	263,000	26
		A24	O6.5III	154,000	30
		A25	O8III	88,700	28
		A27	B0Ia	426,000	35
		A29	O9.7Iab	167,500	29.1
		A32	O9.5IV	106,700	26.1
		A36	B0Ib+B0III	173,000	26
		A37	O5V((f))	66,100	34.8
		A46	O7V((f))	46,600	25.6
		E47	B0Ia	676,000	42
		IRAS 20321+4009	O9	278,000	32
		TYC 3156-998-1	OC9.7Ia	516,000	34.2

The progenitor of BD+43°3654 might have been a member of Cygnus OB2. Two stars from two binaries would have collided and merged forming BD+43°3654, which would have then been ejected from the stellar association along with the two remaining stars.

Prominent members of the association are often referred to by their Schulte numbers: for example Schulte 12, VI Cygni 12, or Cygnus OB2 #12. The numbers were first used in the 1953 discovery paper where 11 "blue giants" were numbered. A 12th star (Cyg OB2 #12) was added in 1954, and eight more shortly after. Schulte himself maintained the already-published numbers and added many more when studying the association which he called VI Cygni.

Cygnus OB2 contains embedded star clusters as well as two open clusters located in the center of Cygnus OB2. The open clusters are called Bica 1 and Bica 2. Both Bica 1 and Bica 2 contain several OB-stars, such as Cygnus OB2 #8A and Cygnus OB2 #22.

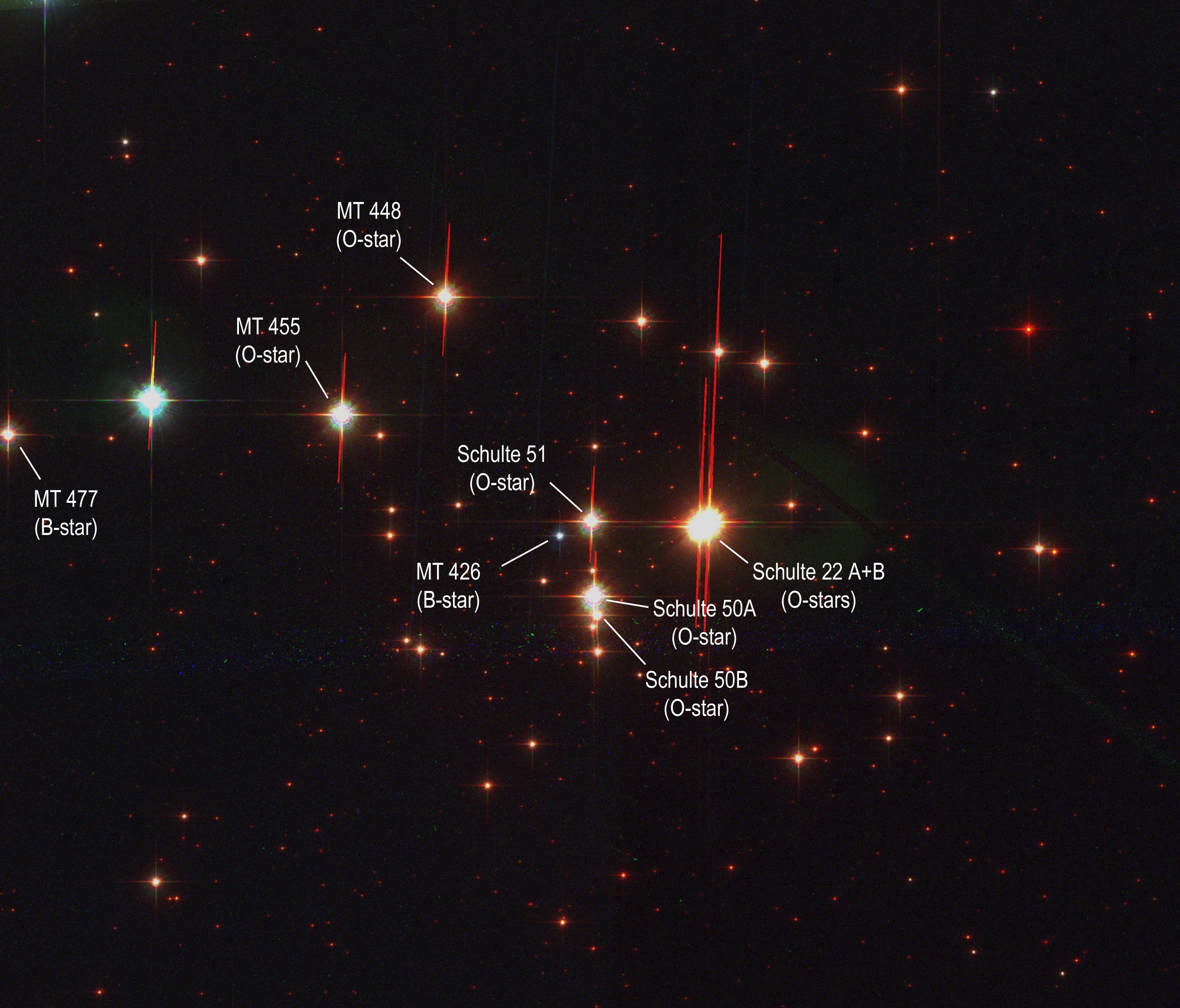
Open cluster Bica 1

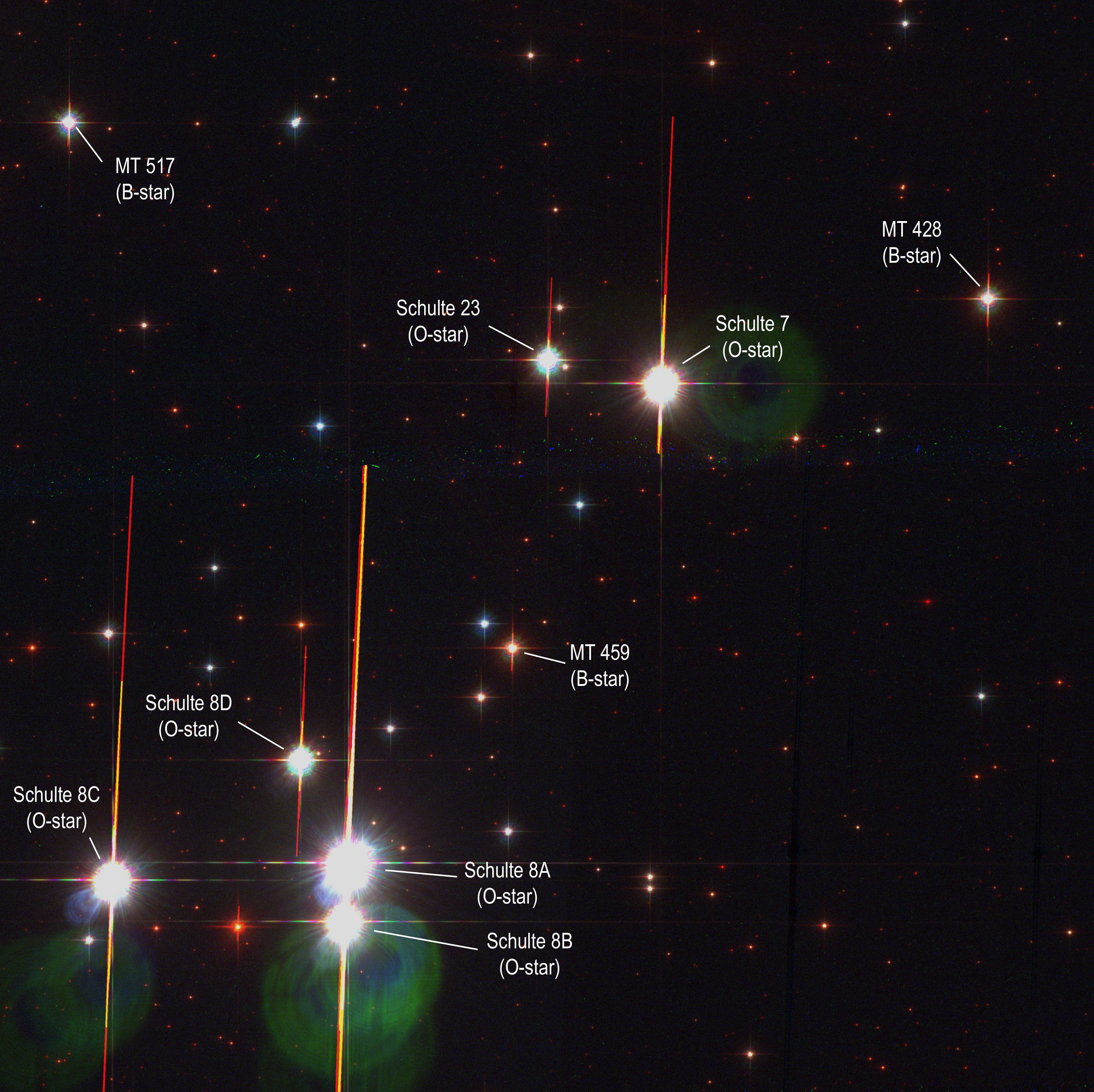
Part of open cluster Bica 2
