= List of luminous blue variable stars =

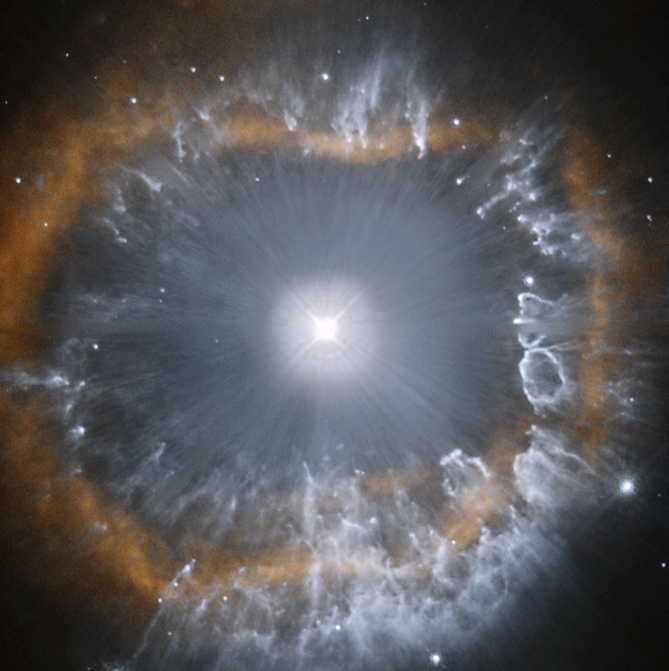
Luminous blue variable AG Carinae as seen by the Hubble Space Telescope

Luminous blue variables (LBVs) are rare, massive, evolved stars that show unpredictable and sometimes dramatic variations in their spectra and brightness. They are also known as S Doradus variables after S Doradus, one of the brightest stars of the Large Magellanic Cloud.

This is a list of luminous blue variable stars in order of their distance from Earth.

== List ==
=== Milky Way galaxy (confirmed LBVs) ===
Star system	Nebula	Median distance (ly)	Spectral type	Apparent magnitude (V)	Comments and references
P Cygni (34 Cygni)		5,251	B1-2 Ia-0ep	4.82	The closest luminous blue variable star to Earth
V4029 Sagittarii (HD 168607)		6,000	B9Ia^{+}	8.12 to 8.29	near the Omega Nebula
V905 Scorpii (HD 160529)		6,100	LBV	6.66	
Eta Carinae		7,500	O + B	−1.0 to ~7.6	part of Trumpler 16 in the Carina Nebula
MWC 930 (V446 Scuti)		11,400	B5/9Iaeq	11.51	
WRAY 16-137		12,400	LBV	15.5	
W1-243		15,000	LBV	15.81	in Westerlund 1
HR Carinae		16,000	LBV+RSG	8.42	
V481 Scuti (LBV G24.73+0.69)		17,000	LBV_B[e]:		
AG Carinae		17,000	B	6.96	
EM* VRMF 55 (MN44)		18,000 or 35,000	LBV	15	
[GKF2010] MN48		20,000	LBV	15.83	
GCIRS 34W (WR 101db)		25,000	Ofpe/WN9		in the Galactic Center
AFGL 2298 (V1672 Aql)		30,000	B8I		
V432 Carinae (Wray 15-751)		33,000	LBV	10.20	Also known as AT 2019ooa
[GKM2012] WS1		39,000	LBV	15.31	
[GKF2010] MN58			LBV		

=== Milky Way galaxy (candidate LBVs) ===
Star system	Nebula	Median distance (ly)	Spectral type	Apparent magnitude (V)	Comments and references
HD 148937		3,870	O6f?p	6.71	central star of NGC 6164
MWC 349A (V1478 Cygni)		4,560	B0-1.5 I + B0 III	13.15	maybe ejected from Cygnus OB2
HD 326823		4,700	WNpec	9.03	
HD 168625		5,000	B6Ia^{+}	8.30–8.41	near the Omega Nebula
Cygnus OB2-12		5,500	B3–4 Ia+	11.702	in Cygnus OB2
AS 314		5,600	B9Ia	9.85	
Zeta^{1} Scorpii		5,600	B1.5 Iae	4.705	
G79.29+0.46		5,700	B:I[e]	15.1	in Cygnus X
WRAY 16-232		6,850	Be	12.5	
HD 80077		8,700	B2.5Ia+	9.00	
HD 316285		10,800	B0Ieq	9.60	
MWC 314 (V1429 Aquilae)		15,000	B3Ibe	9.79 - 10.1	
[SBW2007] 1		18,500	B1Iab	12.7	
Sher 25		21,000	cLBV	12.23	in NGC 3603
W51 LS1 (V1936 Aquilae)		22,000	O4I	15.1	
WRAY 17-96		22,000	cLBV	~13.0	
[B61] 2		22,000	LBV_B[e]:	15.00	
WR 102ka		26,000	WN10		near the Galactic Center
GCIRS 16SW		27,000	Ofpe/WN9		in the Galactic Center
LBV 1806−20		28,000	cLBV		part of the 1806−20 cluster
Hen 3-519		28,000	WN11h	10.85	
MSX6C G026.4700+00.0207		30,000	LBV_B		
Pistol Star (V4647 Sgr)		25,114	B	>28	part of the Quintuplet Cluster
LBV G0.120-0.048 (V4998 Sgr)		26,000	WN5b		near the Quintuplet Cluster
FMM 362 (V4650 Sgr)		26,000	LBV		near the Quintuplet Cluster

=== Magellanic Clouds ===
The Large Magellanic Cloud (LMC) is around 163 kly distant, and the Small Magellanic Cloud (SMC) is around 204 kly distant.

Host galaxy	Star system	Spectral type	Apparent magnitude (V)	Comments and references
LMC	S Doradus	B8/9eq – F0/5:Iae	8.6 – 11.5	
LMC	HD 269858 (R127)	B	10.15	
LMC	HD 269006 (R71)	LBV	10.55	
LMC	HD 269216 (SK −69 75)	OBe	11.123	
LMC	HD 269582 (SK −69 142a)	WN10h	11.093	
LMC	HD 269662 (R110)	A0Ia	10.28	
LMC	HD 269700 (R116)	B1.5Iaeq	10.54	
LMC	R143 (CPD-69 463)	F7Ia	12.014	
SMC	HD 5980 (R14)	WN4+O7I:	11.31	
SMC	HD 6884 (R40)	B9Ia0ek	10.2	

=== Andromeda Galaxy and Triangulum Galaxy ===
The Andromeda Galaxy (M31) is 2.5 Mly distant, and the Triangulum Galaxy is around 3.2 Mly distant.

Host galaxy	Star system	Spectral type	Apparent magnitude (V)	Comments and references
Andromeda	LGGS J004051.59+403303.0	LBV	16.989	
Andromeda	AE Andromedae (HV 4476)	LBV	17.0–17.9	
Andromeda	AF Andromedae (HV 4013)	LBV	17.325	
Andromeda	Var 15 ([WB92a] 370)	LBV	18.450	
Andromeda	Var A-1	LBV	17.143	
Andromeda	UCAC4 660-003111	LBV	16.39	
Triangulum	Var C	LBV	16.429	
Triangulum	Var B	LBV	16.208	
Triangulum	Var 83	LBV	15.4–16.6	
Triangulum	Var 2 (Y Trianguli)	Ofpe/WN9	18.22	
Triangulum	Romano’s Star (M33 V0532)	Ofpe/WN9	16.5–18.8	

=== Other Galaxies ===
Host Galaxy	Star system	Median distance (ly)	Spectral type	Apparent magnitude (V)	Comments and references
NGC 3109	AT 2018akx	4,350,000	LBV	17.5 - 19.28	
NGC 2403	AT 2016ccd	9,650,000	LBV	18.0 - 19.95	Also known as SNhunt225.
NGC 2403	NGC 2403 V14	9,650,000	LBV		
NGC 4214	SN 2010U	9,700,000	LBV	16	
NGC 2363	NGC 2363-V1	10,800,000	LBV	17.88	One of the most luminous stars known.
NGC 45	AT 2018htr	21,700,000	LBV	17.469	
Whirlpool Galaxy	M51 OT2019-1	23,500,000	LBV		
NGC 2537	AT 2017be	27,900,000	LBV	18.349 - 18.5	Distance from NED using redshift of host galaxy.
NGC 4559	AT 2016blu	29,000,000	LBV	15.9 – 19	Repeated outbursts have been observed since January 2012.
NGC 7286	AT 2019mil	32,400,000	LBV	19	Distance from NED using redshift of host galaxy.
UGC 5829	AT 2021blu	43,500,000	LBV	18.17 - 21.62	Distance from NED using redshift of host galaxy.
NGC 4656	Variable in NGC 4656	43,700,000	LBV	18	Distance from NED using redshift of host galaxy.
NGC 4389	AT 2022fnm	44,700,000	LBV	18.495 - 17.855	Distance from NED using redshift of host galaxy.
ESO 249- G 015	AT 2020agp	47,500,000	LBV	18.463	Distance from NED using redshift of host galaxy.
NGC 908	AT 2021ablz	56,000,000	LBV	20.58	
UGC 5979	SN 2007sv	58,270,000	LBV	17.4	Distance from NED using redshift of host galaxy.
IC 5267A	AT 2019oet	60,000,000	LBV	18.335	Distance from NED using redshift of host galaxy.
NGC 3003	AT 2020jev	61,200,000	LBV	18.74 - 20.33	Distance from NED using mean distance.
NGC 2748	PSN J09132750+7627410	61,300,000	LBV	18.3	
NGC 3423	AT 2019ahd	65,600,000	LBV	17.83 - 18.73	Distance from NED using redshift of host galaxy.
NGC 1385	AT 2020pju	66,400,000	LBV	17.3 - 19.73	
NGC 718	AT 2019udc	69,800,000	LBV	17.53 - 19.09	Distance from NED using redshift of host galaxy.
PHL 293B	SDSS J2230–0006	75,510,000	LBV		
NGC 2770	SN 2015bh	77,000,000	LBV		
NGC 5334	SN 2003gm	80,196,000	LBV	17.0	Distance from NED using redshift of host galaxy.
NGC 6509	PSN J17592296+0617267	95,300,000	LBV	18.5	
NGC 4045	AT 2019wbg	111,500,000	LBV	17.7 -19.39	Repeated outbursts observed since discovery. Distance from NED using redshift of host galaxy.
NGC 4532	AT 2017des	112,800,000	LBV	18.817 - 19.85	Distance from NED using redshift of host galaxy.
ESO 602- G 015	AT 2022rmk	113,200,000	LBV	19.472 - 20.04	Distance from NED using redshift of host galaxy.
UGC 9113	AT 2017dau	162,100,000	LBV	19.32 - 21.32	Distance from NED using redshift of host galaxy.
MCG +07-07-070	AT 2018kle	180,200,000	LBV	18.797 - 18.91	Distance from NED using redshift of host galaxy.
UGC 449	AT 2022oku	239,100,000	LBV	18.781 - 19.49	Distance from NED using redshift of host galaxy.
WISEA J010803.49+010843.7	AT 2020zmn	262,600,000	LBV	20.31 - 20.85	Distance from NED using redshift of host galaxy.
Sunburst Galaxy	Godzilla	10,900,000,000	LBV		

== See also ==
- List of Wolf-Rayet stars
- List of O-type stars
