= Carmelle Robert =

Canadian astrophysicist

- Born: 1962 (age 63–64)
- Education: University of Sherbrooke; University of Montreal
- Known for: Starburst research
- Scientific career
- Fields: Astrophysics
- Workplaces: Space Telescope Science Institute; Université Laval
- Thesis: Inhomogénéités dans le vent des étoiles Wolf-Rayet Inhomogeneities in the wind of Wolf-Rayet stars (1992)

Carmelle Robert (born 1962) is a Quebec astrophysicist, starburst researcher and professor at the Department of Physics, Physical Engineering and Optics at Université Laval, in Quebec City, Quebec.

== Biography ==
Robert earned her undergraduate degree in physics from the University of Sherbrooke (1984), and her master's and a doctorate in astrophysics from, University of Montreal (1987, 1992 respectively). She also completed her postdoctoral fellowships including one with the Space Telescope Science Institute in Baltimore, Maryland (1991-1994).

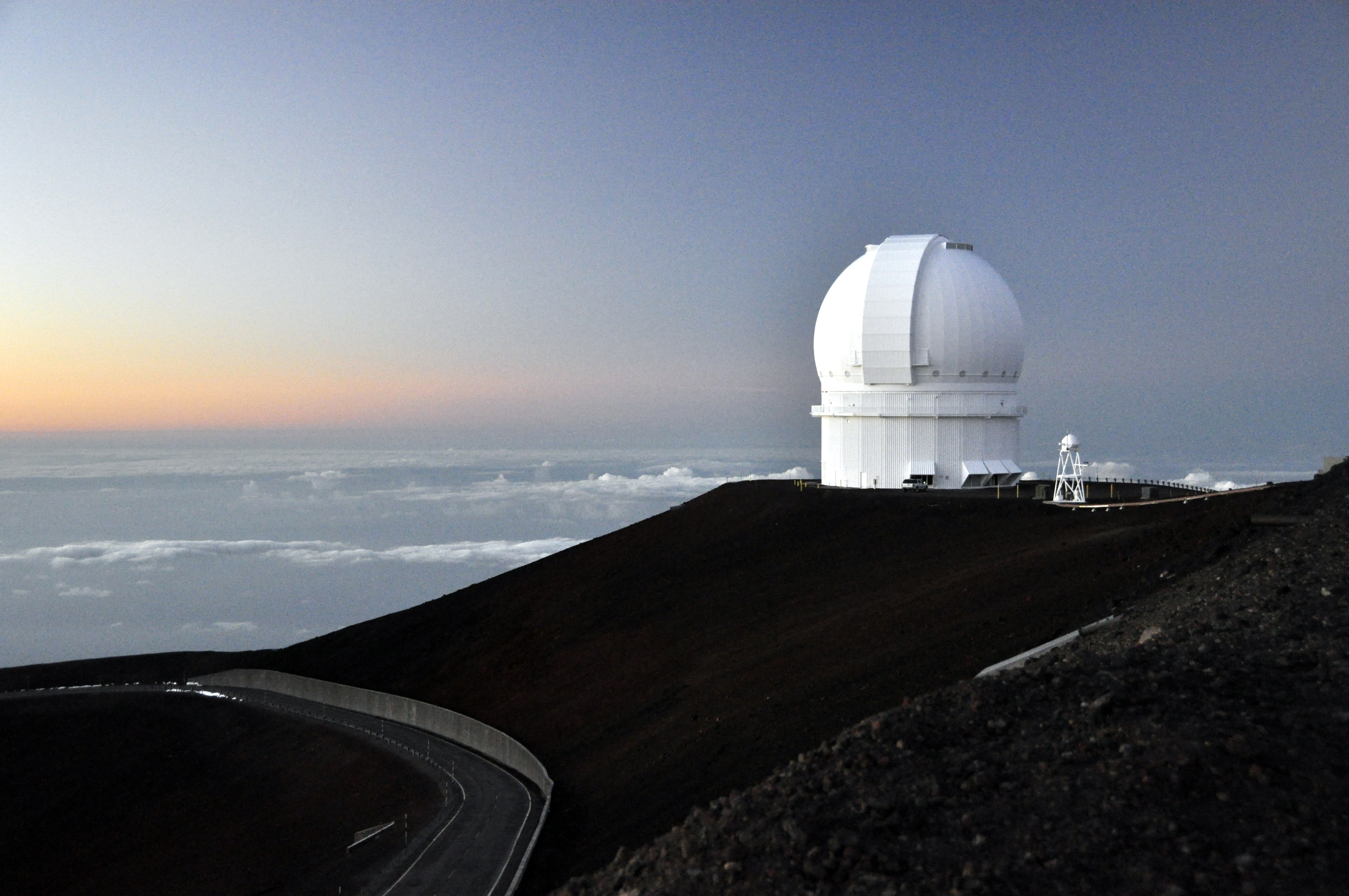
Canada-France-Hawaii Astronomical Observatory atop Mauna Kea, Hawaii.

As a graduate student, Robert investigated the wind clumps observed in the spectrum of the Cygnus Wolf-Rayet stars, using the Canada-France-Hawaii Telescope with her advisor Anthony Moffat. As a postdoc at the Space Telescope Science Institute, she applied this expertise on massive stars to study starburst regions in distant galaxies in the ultraviolet light.

In 1995 she received a Women Faculty Award from the National Sciences and Engineering Research Council of Canada enabling her to return to Université Laval in Quebec. One of her grad students there was Laurie Rousseau-Nepton, the first indigenous woman in Quebec to obtain a Ph.D. in astrophysics.

For the academic year ending April 2018, she took a leave of absence to conduct research at the University of Hawaiʻi at Hilo from September 2017 to April 2018.

=== Research ===
Robert's research includes the characterization of the different generations of stars in galaxies and uses that information to understand the mechanisms that drive the evolution of galaxies. One of her key focus areas is known as a starburst region.

According to one report,

"The peculiarity of the spectral signatures collected by Anne Pellerin and Carmelle Robert is due to the fact that they cover a light not visible to the naked eye, the distant ultraviolet, "a light associated with events of very high energy," specifies the student-researcher. Paradoxically, this type of light does not cross the Earth's atmosphere. To collect it, you must therefore go hunting it in its natural habitat, there it frolics freely: space. Since June 24, 1999, an exceptional tool for amassing this precious light has been circling the Earth."

As part of her research, Robert has developed a synthesis code, which can be used to "determine the right mixture of star spectra which will reproduce as faithfully as possible the spectral signature of distant galaxies in the manner of a painter who seeks the right dosage of pigments to obtain the desired color."

=== Supernova discovery ===
On the night of February 9, 1996, Robert was part of a team of four astrophysicists from Université Laval to discover a supernova now called SN1996D, which is located in the galaxy NGC 1614, 250 million light years from Earth. Working with colleagues Laurent Drissen, Yvan Dutil and Jean-René Roy, the discovery was made at the Canada-France-Hawaii Astronomical Observatory, located at the top of Mauna Kea on the island of Hawaii. A paper about the event said, "SN1996D appeared suddenly following the explosion of a star whose mass would be about ten times that of the Sun." The supernova is not readily visible to the naked eye but using a quality telescope, amateur observers could expect to see it in dark skies.

=== Luminous blue variable star discovery ===
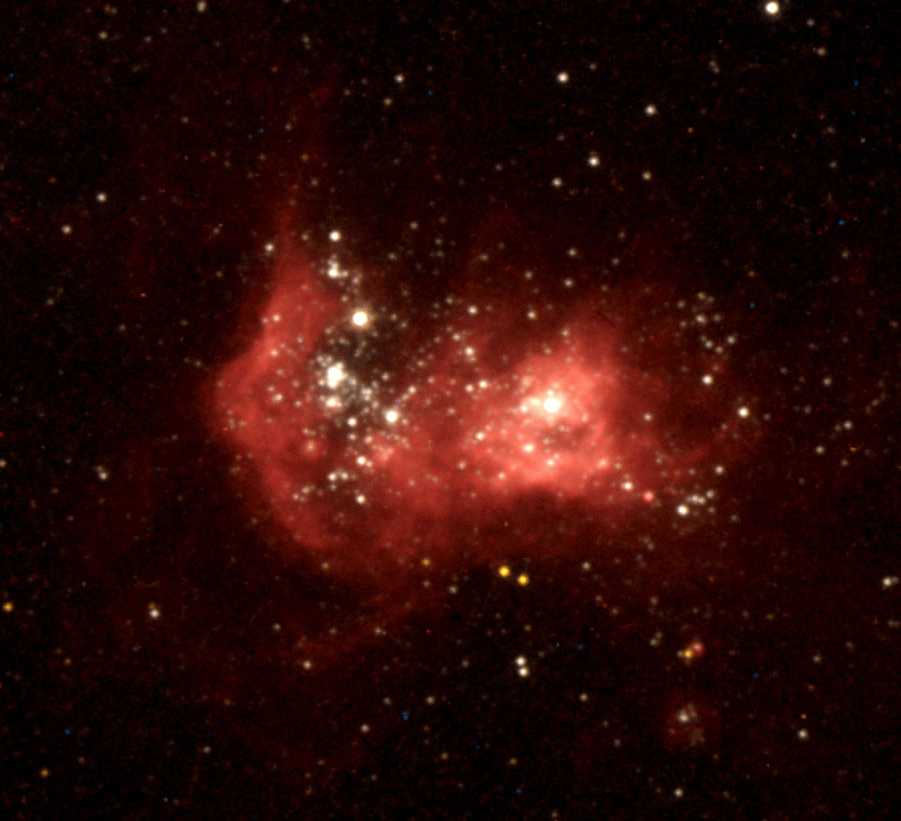
NGC 2363 as seen by the Hubble Space Telescope. The isolated bright star above and left of center is the luminous blue variable NGC 2363-V1.

In 1996, Robert was credited, along with two other astrophysicists, for the discovery of a new luminous blue variable star called NGC 2363-V1, which is located in the star-forming region NGC 2363, at the far southwestern part of the irregular galaxy called NGC 2366 in the constellation Camelopardalis, in the northern celestial hemisphere. It is almost 11 million light years away from the Earth's galaxy. Working with Laurent Drissen and Jean-René Roy, the group discovered the new star after closely examining images taken by the Hubble Space Telescope Wide Field Planetary Camera.

== Memberships ==
- UL Astrophysics Research Group (GRAUL)
- Center for Research in Astrophysics of Quebec (CRAQ), Deputy Director
- Canadian Astrophysical Society (CASCA)
- Canadian Foundation for the International Space University (CFISU), Member, Board of Directors

== Selected publications ==
According to WorldCat.org, Robert has 13 works in 23 publications in 2 languages as of 2020.

- Leitherer, C., Schaerer, D., Goldader, J. D., Delgado, R. M. G., Robert, C., Kune, D. F., ... & Heckman, T. M. (1999). Starburst99: synthesis models for galaxies with active star formation. The Astrophysical Journal Supplement Series, 123(1), page 3.
- Heckman, T. M., Robert, C., Leitherer, C., Garnett, D. R., & van der Rydt, F. (1998). The ultraviolet spectroscopic properties of local starbursts: implications at high redshift. The Astrophysical Journal, 503(2), page 646.
- Drissen, Laurent; Roy, Jean-René; Robert, Carmelle (1997). A New Luminous Blue Variable in the Giant Extragalactic H II Region NGC 2363. The Astrophysical Journal. 474: L35. Bibcode:1997 ApJ...474L..35D. doi:10.1086/310417.
- Leitherer, C., Robert, C., & Heckman, T. M. (1995). Atlas of Synthetic Ultraviolet Spectra of Massive Star Populations. The Astrophysical Journal Supplement Series, 99, page 173.
- Moffat, A. F., & Robert, C. (1994). Clumping and mass loss in hot star winds. The Astrophysical Journal, 421, pages 310-313.
- Robert, C., Leitherer, C., & Heckman, T. M. (1993). Synthetic UV Lines of Si IV, C IV, and He II from a Population of Massive Stars in Starburst Galaxies. The Astrophysical Journal, 418, page 749.
- Robert, C., Moffat, A. F., Drissen, L., Lamontagne, R., Seggewiss, W., Niemela, V. S., ... & Tapia, S. (1992). Photometry, polarimetry, spectroscopy, and spectropolarimetry of the enigmatic Wolf-Rayet star EZ Canis Majoris. The Astrophysical Journal, 397, pages 277-303.
- Leitherer, C., Robert, C., & Drissen, L. (1992). Deposition of mass, momentum, and energy by massive stars into the interstellar medium. The Astrophysical Journal, 401, pages 596-617.
- Drissen, L., Robert, C., & Moffat, A. F. (1992). Polarization variability among Wolf-Rayet stars. VII-The single stars WR 14, WR 25, and WR 69. The Astrophysical Journal, 386, pages 288-292.
- Leitherer, C., & Robert, C. (1991). Observations of stellar winds from hot stars at 1.3 millimeters. The Astrophysical Journal, 377, pages 629-638.
