= NGC 907 =

Barred spiral galaxy in the constellation Cetus

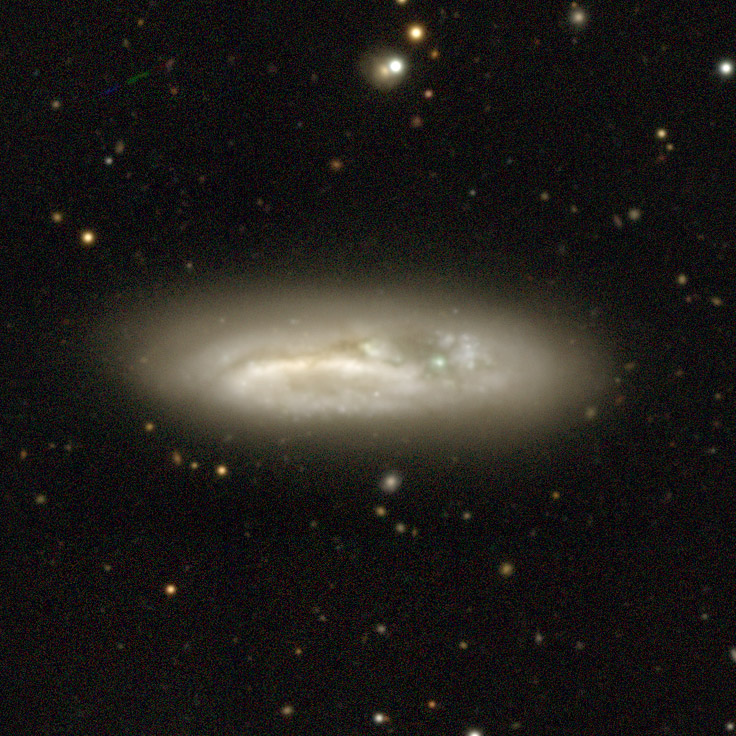
- NGC 907 as seen from Dark Energy Camera (DECam) at NOIRLab.

Observation data (J2000 epoch)
- Constellation: Cetus
- Right ascension: 02^{h} 23^{m} 01.9^{s}
- Declination: −20° 42′ 43″
- Redshift: 1649.9 km/s
- Distance: 25.7 ± 6.0 Mpc
- Group or cluster: NGC 908 group
- Apparent magnitude (B): 13.3

Characteristics
- Type: Seyfert 2
- Apparent size (V): 2'.0 x 0'.6

NGC 907 is a barred spiral galaxy in the constellation of Cetus. It was discovered on 20 October 1784 by William Herschel. The galaxy is a member of the NGC 908 group and is interacting with the neighboring galaxies IC 223 and NGC 899. NGC 907 is near the celestial equator and visible to observers in both hemispheres.

== Gallery ==
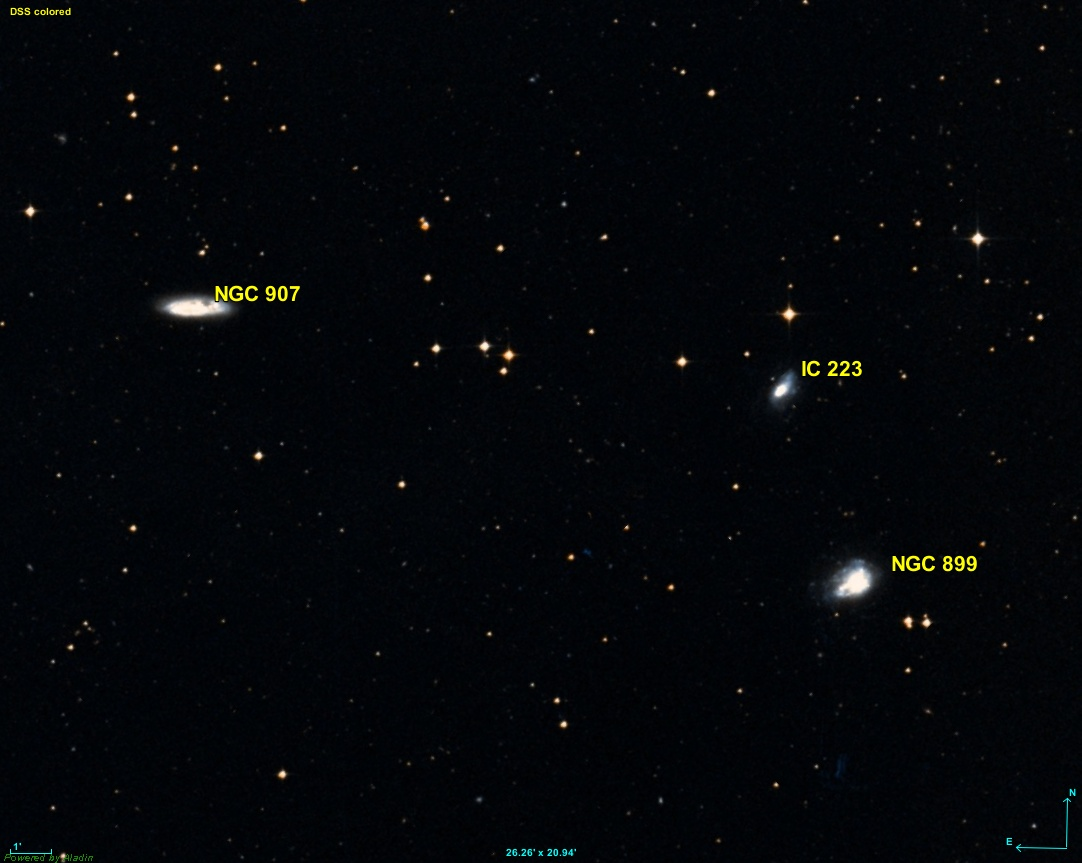
NGC 907, IC 223, and NGC 899

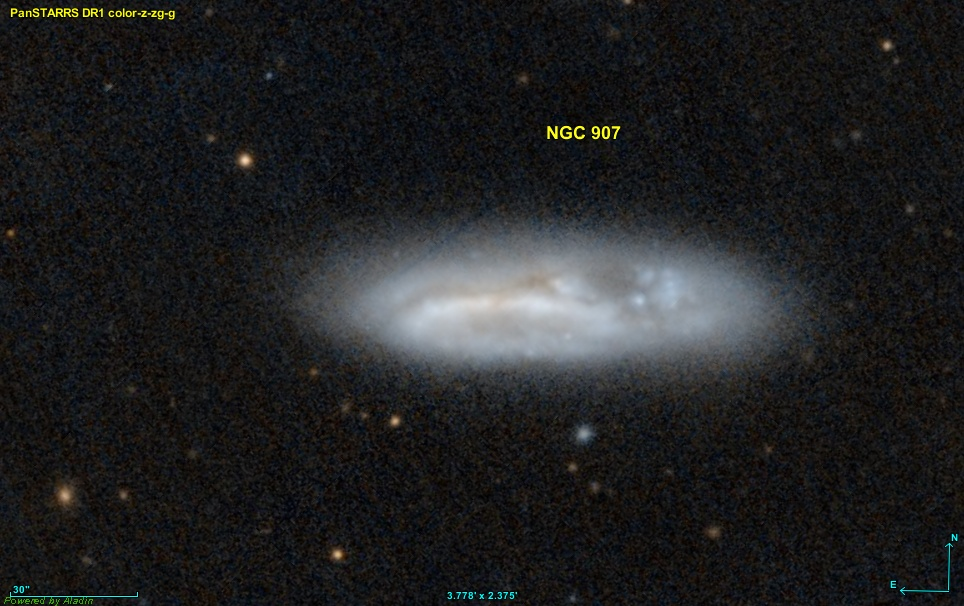
NGC 907 as seen from Pan-STARRS (Panoramic Survey Telescope And Rapid Response System).
