= Laurie Rousseau-Nepton =

Canadian astronomer

- Born: 1985 or 1986 (age 39–40)
- Education: Université Laval
- Scientific career
- Fields: Astrophysics
- Workplaces: University of Toronto
- Thesis: Étude des régions de formation stellaire dans les galaxies spirales avec SpIOMM (2017)
- Academic advisors: Carmelle Robert

Laurie Rousseau-Nepton is a Canadian astronomer at the Dunlap Institute for Astronomy & Astrophysics at the University of Toronto, and was the first Indigenous woman in Canada to obtain a Ph.D. in astrophysics.

== Early life and education ==
Rousseau-Nepton is an Innu woman whose family are from the Mashteuiatsh reserve in the Saguenay–Lac-Saint-Jean region of Quebec. Her mother was a civil engineering technician and her father was a civil engineer. She grew up near Quebec City, and lived for two years on the Wendake reserve. Her interest in science was sparked as a child when she went on a hunting trip with her father to the Ashuapmushuan Wildlife Reserve in Quebec. During the day, she became attentive to details, observing small changes in the environment to be a better hunter. At night, she was able to observe changes in the night sky such as shooting stars and the aurora borealis.

During her studies in Cégep, she was attracted by physics because it was both challenging and offered freedom in methods of problem solving.

Rousseau-Nepton completed her bachelor's, master's, and PhD degrees from Université Laval. She received her Ph.D. in 2017, under the supervision of Carmelle Robert. Her doctoral research involved studying the HII regions of nearby spiral galaxies, using the SpIOMM, an imaging Fourier transform spectrometer developed at University of Laval for the Mont-Mégantic Observatory.

== Career ==
After completing her PhD, Rousseau-Nepton took up an appointment as an FRQNT postdoctoral research fellow at the University of Hawaiʻi at Hilo. From 2017 to 2023, she was a resident astronomer at the Canada–France–Hawaii Telescope. Rousseau-Nepton is the Principal Investigator for SIGNALS, a large survey program aiming at observing over 50,000 resolved star-forming regions in nearby galaxies. In September 2023, she became an assistant professor at the University of Toronto.

Rousseau-Nepton began researching Innu oral traditions about astronomy after she was asked speak about the perspective on eclipses among First Nations by a colleague. In interviews, she has drawn a connection between her work on star formation and the lifecycle of stars and the Innu tradition that people come from the stars, and will return to the sky after our time on Earth.

In 2023, she was the subject of the film series North Star produced by the National Film Board of Canada.

== Honors and awards ==
Awards won include:

- Qilak Award from the Canadian Astronomical Society, 2023
- Post-Doctoral Fellow, Fonds de Recherche du Québec – Nature et Technologies (FRQNT), 2017-2019
- Pierre Amiot - Award for the best scientific talk, Université Laval, 2014
- Hubert Reeves Fellowship, Fonds Hubert Reeves, 2010
- Fellowship for native woman in science, Association des femmes diplômées des universités du Québec (AFDU) 2010
