= NGC 2363-V1 =

Luminous blue variable star in the constellation Camelopardalis

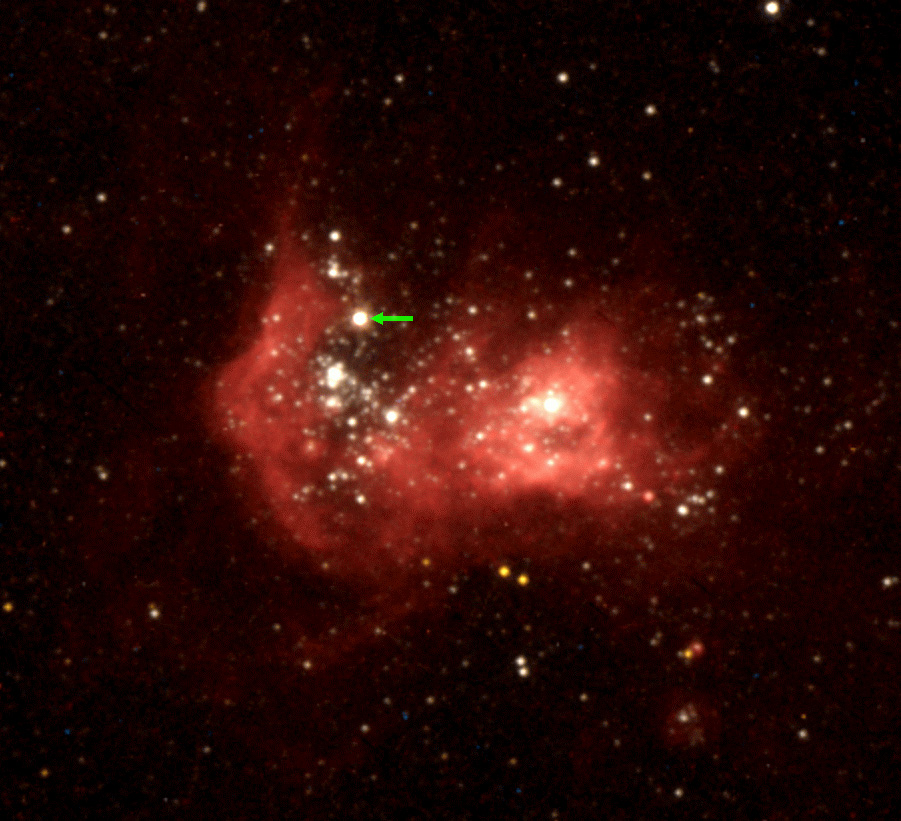
- The H II region NGC 2363 as seen by the Hubble Space Telescope. The green arrow points to NGC 2363-V1. Credit: NASA/ESA

Observation data Epoch J2000.0 Equinox J2000.0
- Constellation: Camelopardalis
- Right ascension: 07^{h} 28^{m} 43.37^{s}
- Declination: +69° 11′ 23.9″
- Apparent magnitude (V): 17.88

Characteristics
- Evolutionary stage: LBV
- Spectral type: LBV
- Variable type: LBV

Astrometry
Distance	10,800,000 ly (3,300,000 pc)
Absolute magnitude (M_{V})	−10.25

Details
Mass	~20 M_{☉}
Radius	194 – 356 R_{☉}
Luminosity (bolometric)	≤790,000 – 6,310,000 L_{☉}
Temperature	13,500 - 26,000 K
Metallicity [Fe/H]	−1 – −0.6 dex
Age	4-5 Myr

Database references
SIMBAD	data

NGC 2363-V1 is a luminous blue variable star in the star-forming region NGC 2363, at the far southwestern part of the irregular galaxy NGC 2366 in the constellation Camelopardalis, near the north celestial pole nearly 11 million light years away from our galaxy. It was discovered in 1996 by Laurent Drissen, Jean-René Roy, and Carmelle Robert while examining images taken by the Hubble Space Telescope Wide Field Planetary Camera 2.

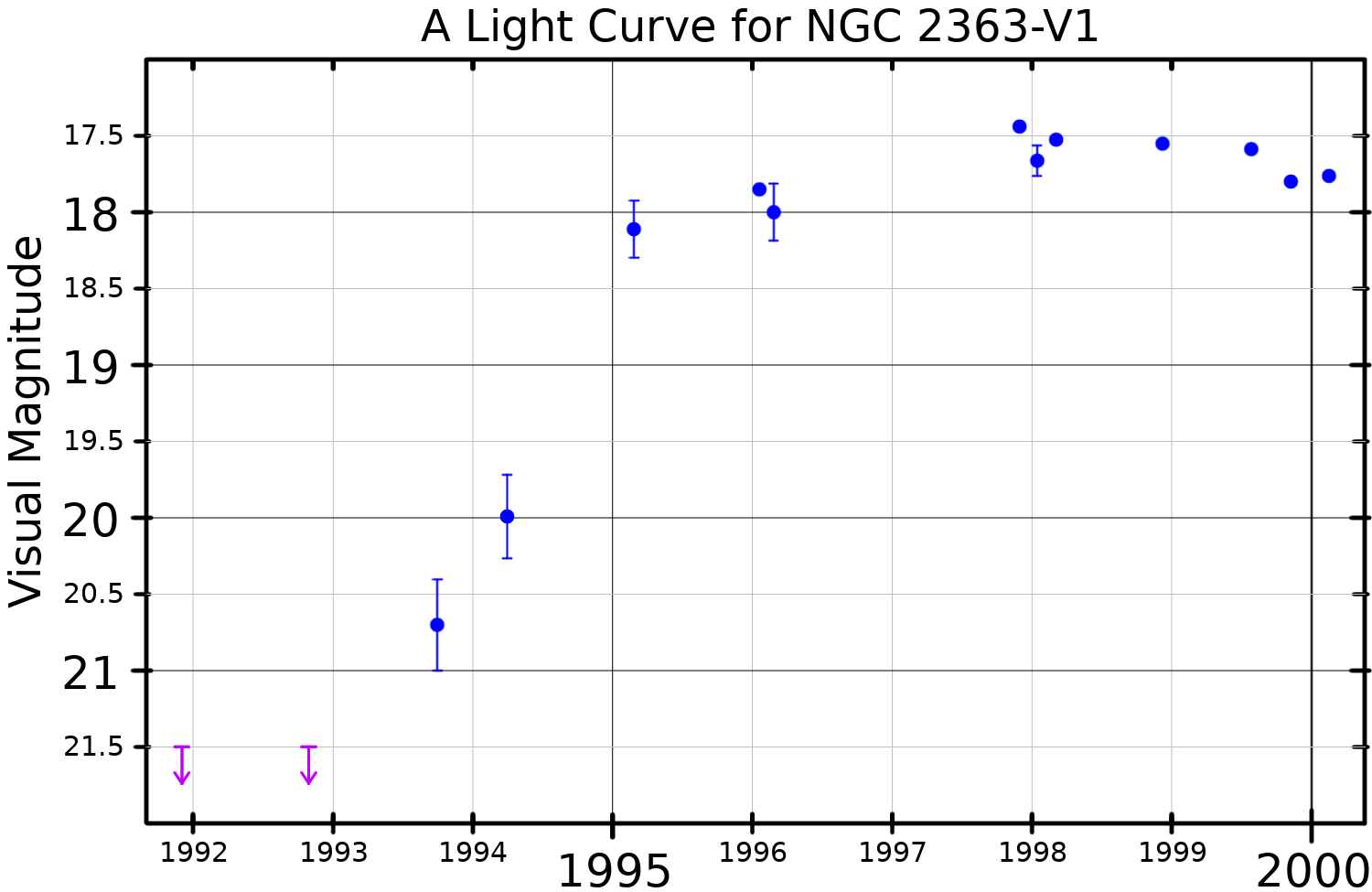
A visual band light curve for NGC 2363-V1, adapted from Drissen et al. (2001). The purple arrows show upper limits.

NGC 2363-V1 is one of the most luminous stars known. It has been undergoing an increase in temperature and luminosity for the last 20 years, after a dramatic increase in its rate of mass loss. Significant luminosity variation within a human lifetime is rare in LBVs, e.g. Eta Carinae during its Great Eruption (1837 to 1855). NGC 2363-V1 shows an extreme B hypergiant spectrum similar to P Cygni rather than the presently cool Eta Carinae outburst spectrum.
