= NGC 718 =

Galaxy in the constellation Pisces

- NGC 718 as imaged by the Hubble Space Telescope with color data from the Sloan Digital Sky Survey

Observation data (J2000 epoch)
- Constellation: Pisces
- Right ascension: 01^{h} 53^{m} 13.2826^{s}
- Declination: +04° 11′ 44.805″
- Redshift: 0.005781±0.0000300
- Heliocentric radial velocity: 1,733±9 km/s
- Distance: 69.7 ± 5.0 Mly (21.38 ± 1.54 Mpc)
- Group or cluster: NGC 676 group
- Apparent magnitude (V): 12.59

Characteristics
- Type: SAB(s)a
- Size: ~99,000 ly (30.35 kpc) (estimated)
- Apparent size (V): 2.3′ × 2.0′

Other designations
- IRAS 01506+0357, 2MASX J01531331+0411453, UGC 1356, MCG +01-05-041, PGC 6993, CGCG 412-039

NGC 718 is an intermediate spiral galaxy in the constellation of Pisces. Its velocity with respect to the cosmic microwave background is 1,450±22 km/s, which corresponds to a Hubble distance of 69.7 ± 5.0 Mly (21.38 ± 1.54 Mpc). Additionally, one non-redshift measurement gives a similar distance of 69.80 Mly (21.400 Mpc). It was discovered by German-British astronomer William Herschel on 13 December 1784.

NGC 718 has a possible active galactic nucleus, i.e. it has a compact region at the center of a galaxy that emits a significant amount of energy across the electromagnetic spectrum, with characteristics indicating that this luminosity is not produced by the stars.

A star-forming disk has been detected around the core of NGC 718. The size of its semi-major axis is estimated at 1,100 ly (330 pc).

== Supermassive black hole ==
Based on measurements of the near-infrared K-band luminosity of the galaxy's bulge, NGC 718 has a supermassive black hole with a mass of 1×10^{7.5}M_{☉} (32 million solar masses).

== NGC 676 group ==
NGC 718 is a member of a small group of three galaxies known as the NGC 676 group. The other two galaxies are NGC 676 and NGC 693.

== Intermediate-luminosity red transient ==
One intermediate-luminosity red transient (ILRT) has been observed in NGC 718:

- AT 2019udc (Type ILRT, mag. 18.813) was discovered by the Distance Less Than 40 Mpc Survey (DLT40) on 4 November 2019. This object had initially been classified as a luminous blue variable.

== See also ==
- List of NGC objects (1–1000)
