= 16 Sagittarii =

Star in the constellation Sagittarius

Observation data Epoch J2000 Equinox ICRS
- Constellation: Sagittarius
- Right ascension: 18^{h} 15^{m} 12.96915^{s}
- Declination: −20° 23′ 16.7021″
- Apparent magnitude (V): 6.02

Characteristics
- Spectral type: O9.5 III
- B−V color index: 0.02

Astrometry
Radial velocity (R_{v})	−11.0±1.3 km/s
Proper motion (μ)	RA: +1.60 mas/yr Dec.: −1.51 mas/yr
Distance	4,600 ly (1,400 pc)

Orbit
Period (P)	12.76123±0.00022 d
Eccentricity (e)	0.181±0.060
Periastron epoch (T)	54005.3 ± 0.7
Argument of periastron (ω) (secondary)	156±19°
Semi-amplitude (K_{1}) (primary)	22.1±2.8 km/s

Details

16 Sgr Aa
Mass	50 M_{☉}
Radius	12.5±0.5 R_{☉}
Surface gravity (log g)	3.3449+0.0270 −0.0247 cgs
Temperature	21,691+149 −159 K
Metallicity [Fe/H]	0.0123+0.0189 −0.0100 dex
Rotational velocity (v sin i)	51 km/s

16 Sgr Ab
Mass	3.72 M_{☉}

Other designations
- 16 Sgr, BD−20° 5055, HD 167263, HIP 89440, HR 6823, SAO 186544, WDS J18152-2023A

Database references
SIMBAD	data

16 Sagittarii is a multiple star system in the southern zodiac constellation of Sagittarius. It is near the lower limit of brightness for stars that can be seen with the naked eye, having an apparent visual magnitude of 6.02. The estimated distance to this system is about 4,600 light years. It is a member of the Sgr OB7 cluster. Along with the O-type star 15 Sgr, it is ionizing an H II region along the western edge of the molecular cloud L291.

Mason et al. (1998) found this to be a member of a speckle binary with an estimated orbital period of roughly 130 years and a magnitude difference of 0.4. Both components show indications of a variable radial velocity, suggesting that they are spectroscopic binaries – making it a candidate quadruple star system. However, Tokovinin (2008) considers it a triple star system.

Orbital elements for the main spectroscopic binary, components Aa and Ab, were published by Mayer et al. (2014), giving an orbital period of 12.76 days and an eccentricity of 0.18. This system displays a merged stellar classification of O9.5 III, matching a blue-hued O-type giant star. It shows a longitudinal magnetic field strength of −74±44 G and a projected rotational velocity of 51 km/s. Tokovinin (2008) gives an estimated mass of 50 times the mass of the Sun for the primary, and 3.72 for the secondary. The tertiary member, component B, has 2.54 times the Sun's mass.
