= HD 148937 =

Binary star in the constellation Norma

Observation data Epoch J2000.0 Equinox J2000.0
- Constellation: Norma
- Right ascension: 16^{h} 33^{m} 52.387^{s}
- Declination: −48° 06′ 40.48″
- Apparent magnitude (V): 6.73

Characteristics
- Spectral type: O6f?p
- B−V color index: 0.316±0.003

Astrometry
Radial velocity (R_{v})	−53.9±3.0 km/s
Proper motion (μ)	RA: +0.741 mas/yr Dec.: −3.404 mas/yr
Parallax (π)	0.8417±0.0223 mas
Distance	3,900 ± 100 ly (1,190 ± 30 pc)

Orbit
Period (P)	9,390±300 days
Semi-major axis (a)	33.45±0.73 AU
Eccentricity (e)	0.7782±0.0051
Inclination (i)	84.07±0.10°
Longitude of the node (Ω)	277.27±0.26°
Periastron epoch (T)	56,958.2±2.8 MJD
Argument of periastron (ω) (secondary)	340.10±0.41°
Semi-amplitude (K_{1}) (primary)	28.4^{+3.2}_{−3.6} km/s
Semi-amplitude (K_{2}) (secondary)	31.9^{+3.7}_{−3.4} km/s

Details

A
Mass	29.9^{+3.4}_{−3.1} M_{☉}
Luminosity	191,000^{+28,300}_{−24,600} L_{☉}
Surface gravity (log g)	4.00±0.09 cgs
Temperature	37,200^{+900}_{−400} K
Rotational velocity (v sin i)	165±20 km/s
Age	5 Myr

B
Mass	26.6^{+3.0}_{−3.4} M_{☉}
Luminosity	155,000^{+27,000}_{−23,000} L_{☉}
Surface gravity (log g)	3.61^{+0.05}_{−0.09} cgs
Temperature	35,000^{+300}_{−900} K
Rotational velocity (v sin i)	67±15 km/s

Other designations
- BD−47°10855, GC 22246, HD 148937, HIP 81100, SAO 226891, PPM 321879, WDS J16339-4807A

Database references
SIMBAD	data

HD 148937 is a likely binary star system in the southern constellation of Norma. It has a combined apparent visual magnitude of 6.73, a brightness that is below the limit for being readily visible to the naked eye. Based on parallax measurements, it is located at a distance of approximately 3,900 light years from Sun, but is drifting closer with a radial velocity of about −54 km/s. The star is located in the hourglass-shaped emission nebula NGC 6164/65, which it generated through episodes of mass ejection.

== Observations ==
In 1955, C. S. Gum identified HD 148937 and possibly 15 Sagittarii as responsible for the emission from the region of NGC 6164/65. In 1959, K. G. Heinze catalogued NGC 6164/65 as a planetary nebula and placed HD 148937 at its center, with the two nebulae and the star being co-linear. However, the apparent brightness of HD 148937 is brighter than any other nucleus for a nebula of this class, and the spectra of the star raised questions about their evolutionary status. B. E. Westerlund classified the star as class O6fp in 1960, with the 'O' meaning an O-type star, 'f' indicating emission from ionized helium and nitrogen, and the 'p' meaning an unspecified peculiarity. He found a series of symmetrical nebular shells surrounding the star at angular separations of 3′, 4′, and 44′–64′.

The nebulae surrounding HD 148937

In 1970, R. M. Catchpole and M. W. Feast showed that the radial velocities for the two nebulae are consistent with them being ejecta expanding away from the central star. A very luminous absolute visual magnitude of −6 was confirmed for the central star in 1972, which demonstrated that the surroundings are not a planetary nebula. This star lies within an H II region spanning 2°, which is surrounded by a thin dust shell. In 1980, the star showed a mass loss rate of 2×10^{−7} M_{☉}·yr^{−1}, similar to other O-type main-sequence stars.

An abundance analysis of the surrounding nebulae in 1987 demonstrated a strong overabundance of nitrogen, which most likely comes from stellar processing. This indicates the star is evolved, rather than being in a pre-main-sequence phase. The estimated mass of the NGC 6164/6165 nebulae is twice the mass of the Sun, and it shows a kinetic age of 3×10^{3} yr. The surrounding stellar wind bubble is much older at 2×10^{5} yr.

In 2008, a magnetic field with a longitudinal strength of −276±88 G was detected in the star. It shows spectroscopic variability with a period of 7.031±0.003 d, and has a nitrogen enhancement of about four times that in the Sun. Based on variations in the magnetic field strength, the seven day variance is interpreted as the stellar rotation period. X-ray emission has been detected and is interpreted as originating in hot plasma about one stellar radius from the photosphere.

Observations of the star made between 2015 and 2019 showed a significant change in the spectrum. Radial velocity measurements made during this period suggest that this is a double-lined spectroscopic binary system of high mass stars. Initial measurements suggest they have an eccentric orbit with a period of about 26 years and an orbital eccentricity of 0.75. Only one member of the pair is magnetic, and it appears younger than the companion. This younger star may have been formed by a merger with a third member of the system, an event that can explain both the magnetic field and the surrounding nebula.
