= NGC 6509 =

Galaxy in the constellation Ophiuchus

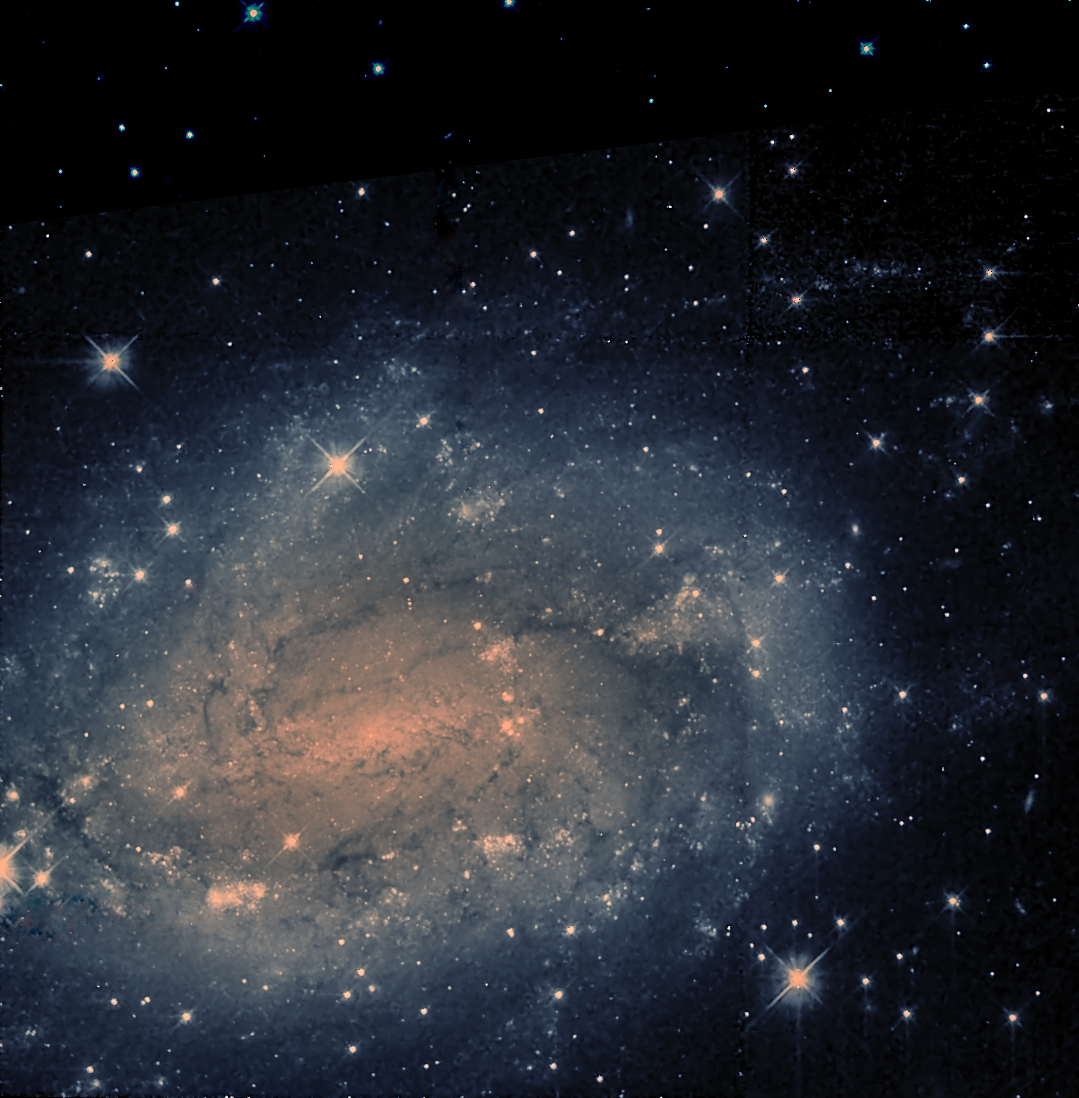
- NGC 6509 imaged by the Hubble Space Telescope

Observation data (J2000 epoch)
- Constellation: Ophiuchus
- Right ascension: 17^{h} 59^{m} 25.315^{s}
- Declination: +06° 17′ 12.86″
- Redshift: 0.006041
- Heliocentric radial velocity: 1,814 km/s
- Distance: 95.3 Mly (29.22 Mpc)
- Apparent magnitude (B): 13.10

Characteristics
- Type: Sd
- Size: ~58,500 ly (17.93 kpc) (estimated)
- Apparent size (V): 1.6′ × 1.2′

Other designations
- NGC 6509, UGC 11075, LEDA 61230, MCG +01-46-002, PGC 61230

NGC 6509 is a spiral galaxy in the equatorial constellation of Ophiuchus. It was discovered on July 20, 1879 by the French astronomer Édouard Stephan. This galaxy is located at a distance of 95.3 million light-years (29.22 Mpc) from the Milky Way, and is receding with a heliocentric radial velocity of 1,814 km/s.

This is a bulge-less disk galaxy with a morphological classification of Sd. The plane of the galaxy is inclined at an angle of 41°±4° to the plane of the sky, and the oval outline is oriented along a position angle of 280.8°±1.1° with an angular span of 1.6′.

The eastern side of this galaxy lies in the foreground of a radio source designated 4C +06.63.

== See also ==
- List of NGC objects (6001–7000)
