= NGC 5334 =

Spiral galaxy in the constellation Virgo

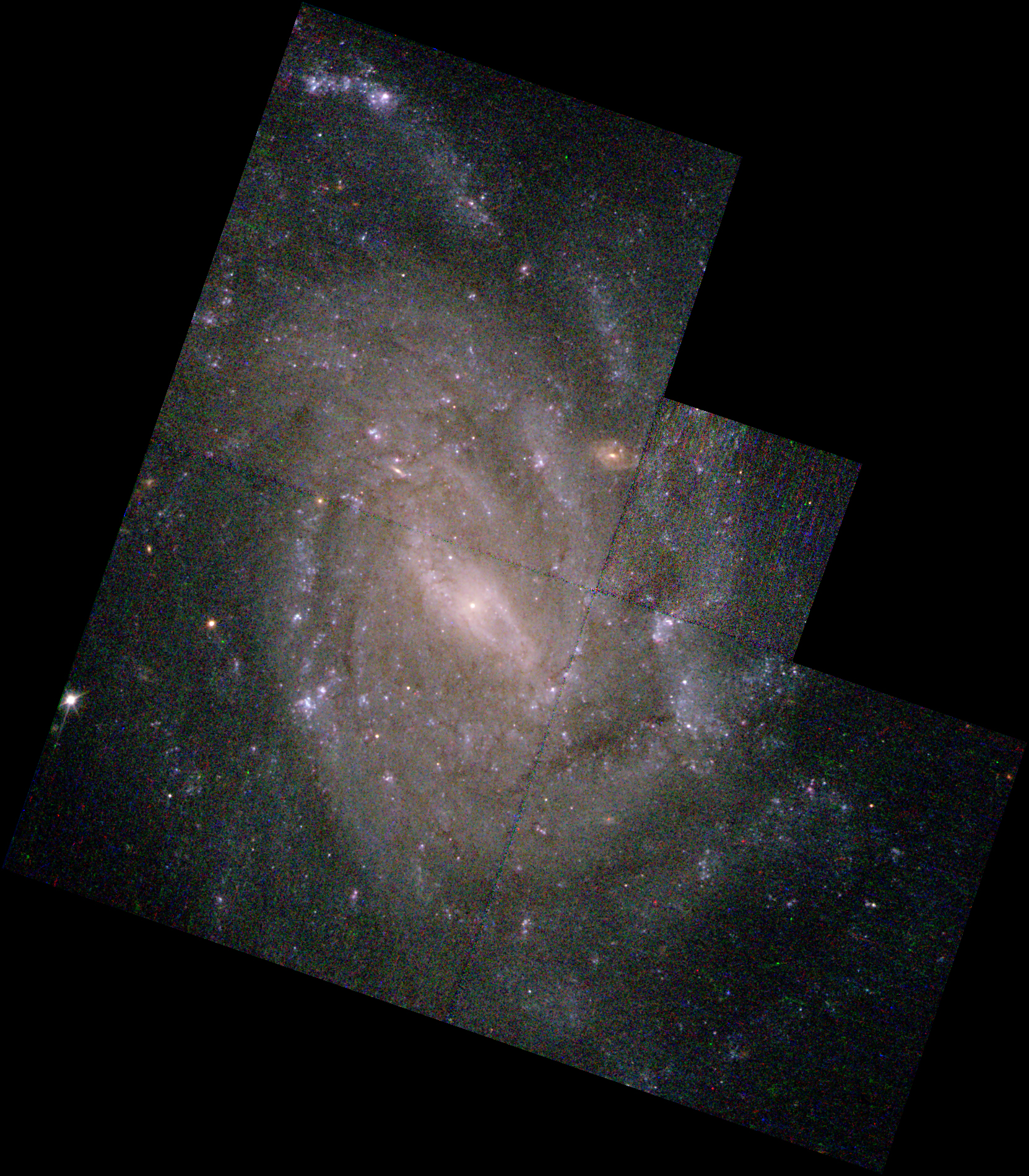
- NGC 5334 imaged by the Hubble Space Telescope

Observation data (J2000 epoch)
- Constellation: Virgo
- Right ascension: 13^{h} 52^{m} 54.479^{s}
- Declination: −01° 06′ 52.035″
- Redshift: 0.004623
- Heliocentric radial velocity: 1386 ± 3 km/s
- Distance: 80.2 ± 5.7 Mly (24.60 ± 1.75 Mpc)
- Apparent magnitude (V): 14.3

Characteristics
- Type: SB(rs)c
- Size: ~142,300 ly (43.62 kpc) (estimated)
- Apparent size (V): 1.9′ × 1.3′

Other designations
- IRAS 13502-0051, IC 4338, UGC 8790, MCG +00-35-024, PGC 49308, CGCG 017-088

NGC 5334 is a face-on barred spiral galaxy in the constellation Virgo. Its velocity with respect to the cosmic microwave background is 1668 ± 20 km/s, which corresponds to a Hubble distance of 80.2 ± 5.7 Mly (24.60 ± 1.75 Mpc). However, five non-redshift measurements give a distance of 108.68 ± 7.45 Mly (33.320 ± 2.283 Mpc). It was discovered by German-British astronomer William Herschel on 15 April 1787. It was also observed by American astronomer Lewis Swift on 20 April 1897 and listed in the Index Catalogue as IC 4338.

NGC 5334 is a member of the Virgo III Groups, a series of galaxies and galaxy clusters strung out to the east of the Virgo Supercluster of galaxies.

Although no supernovae have yet been observed in NGC 5334, a luminous blue variable, designated SN 2003gm (type LBV, mag. 17), was discovered by LOTOSS (Lick Observatory and Tenagra Observatory Supernova Searches) on 6 July 2003.

== See also ==
- List of NGC objects (5001–6000)
