= NGC 2363 =

H II region in the constellation Camelopardalis

Nebula
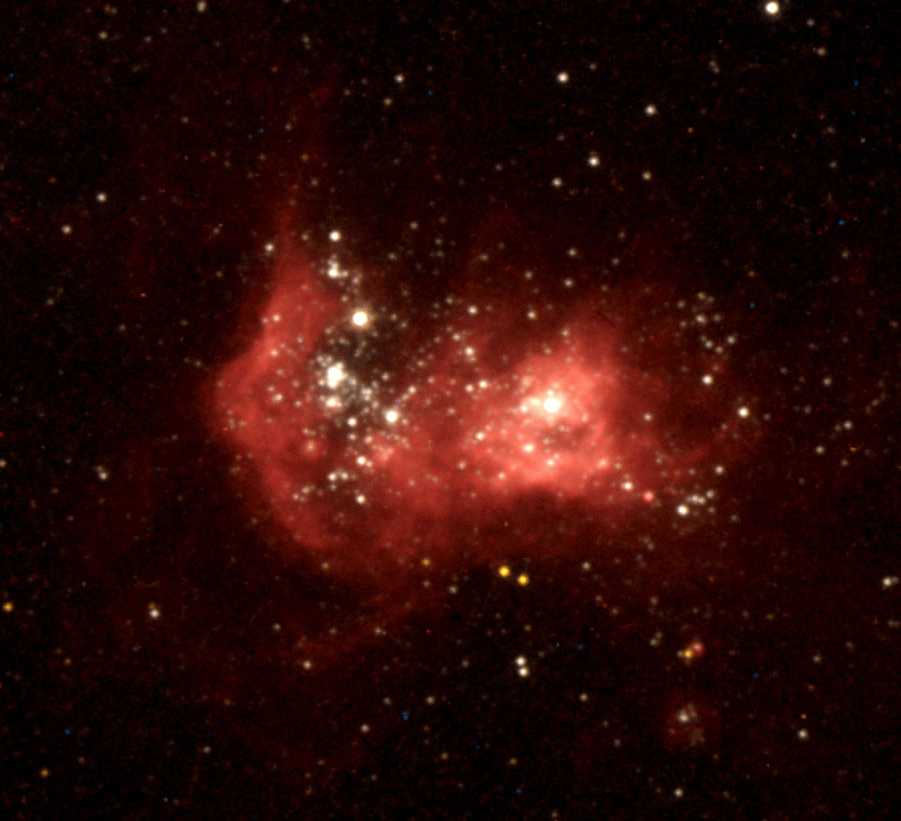
- A Hubble Space Telescope (HST) image of NGC 2363.

Observation data: J2000 epoch
- Right ascension: 07^{h} 28^{m} 29.6^{s}
- Declination: +69° 11′ 34″
- Distance: z=70 km/s
- Apparent magnitude (V): 15.5
- Apparent dimensions (V): 1.7′ × 1.1′
- Constellation: Camelopardalis
- Designations: UGC 3847, MCG +12-07-039, PGC 21078

NGC 2363 is a star-forming region in the Magellanic galaxy NGC 2366 which is located in the constellation Camelopardalis. It contains NGC 2363-V1, a luminous blue variable star which is 6,300,000 times more luminous than the Sun and one of the most luminous stars known. It can be seen in this Hubble Space Telescope image as the bright isolated star in the dark void on the left of the nebula.

According to notes by H. G. Corwin Jr. (2004), the cataloged object NGC 2363 refers to the galaxy UGC 3847, while the original object observed by Herschel is the H II region Mrk 71.
