= NGC 4045 =

Galaxy in the constellation Virgo

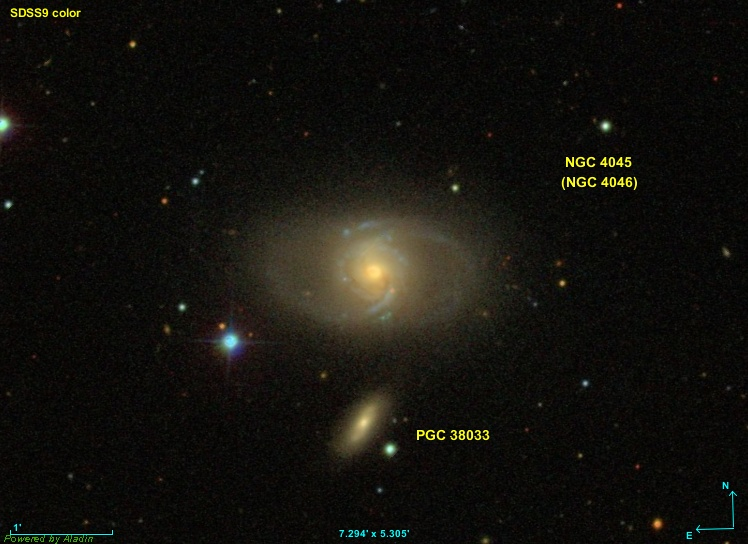
- NGC 4045 imaged by SDSS

Observation data (J2000 epoch)
- Constellation: Virgo
- Right ascension: 12^{h} 02^{m} 42.2488^{s}
- Declination: +01° 58′ 36.271″
- Redshift: 0.006591±0.00000334
- Heliocentric radial velocity: 1,976±1 km/s
- Distance: 100.24 ± 2.77 Mly (30.733 ± 0.849 Mpc)
- Apparent magnitude (V): 12.9g

Characteristics
- Type: SAB(r)a
- Size: ~87,500 ly (26.82 kpc) (estimated)
- Apparent size (V): 2.38′ × 1.14′

Other designations
- HOLM 320A, IRAS 12001+0215, NGC 4046, UGC 7021, MCG +00-31-022, PGC 38031, CGCG 013-046

NGC 4045 is a barred spiral galaxy in the constellation of Virgo. Its velocity with respect to the cosmic microwave background is 2,334±25 km/s, which corresponds to a Hubble distance of 112.3 ± 8.0 Mly (34.42 ± 2.44 Mpc). However, 15 non-redshift measurements give a closer mean distance of 100.24 ± 2.77 Mly (30.733 ± 0.849 Mpc). It was discovered by German-British astronomer William Herschel on 20 December 1784. It was also observed by German astronomer Heinrich Louis d'Arrest on 10 April 1863, causing it to be listed a second time in the New General Catalogue, as NGC 4046.

NGC 4045 is a LINER galaxy, i.e. a galaxy whose nucleus has an emission spectrum characterized by broad lines of weakly ionized atoms. Also, the galaxy is listed as having an active galactic nucleus, and as being a radio galaxy.

NGC 4045 and neighboring galaxy PGC 38033 (also known as NGC 4045A) are listed together as Holm 320 in Erik Holmberg's A Study of Double and Multiple Galaxies Together with Inquiries into some General Metagalactic Problems, published in 1937. However, since PGC 38033 is over twice as distant (~81.6 Mpc) as NGC 4045, the grouping is purely an optical alignment.

== Supernova and luminous blue variable ==
One supernova has been observed in NGC 4045:

- SN 1985B (Type II, mag. 13) was discovered by Shingo Horiguchi on 17 January 1985. A 1987 study classified this supernova as Type Ia.

One luminous blue variable has been observed in NGC 4045:

- AT 2019wbg (Type LBV, mag. 18.775) was discovered by ATLAS on 3 December 2019. It was initially classified as a supernova impostor, then as a Type IIn supernova. In June 2020 it was finally classified as a luminous blue variable, due to its continued up-and-down variability and low luminosity. Since then, it has exhibited repeated outbursts which have confirmed this classification.

== See also ==
- List of NGC objects (4001–5000)
