= NGC 908 =

Galaxy in the constellation Cetus

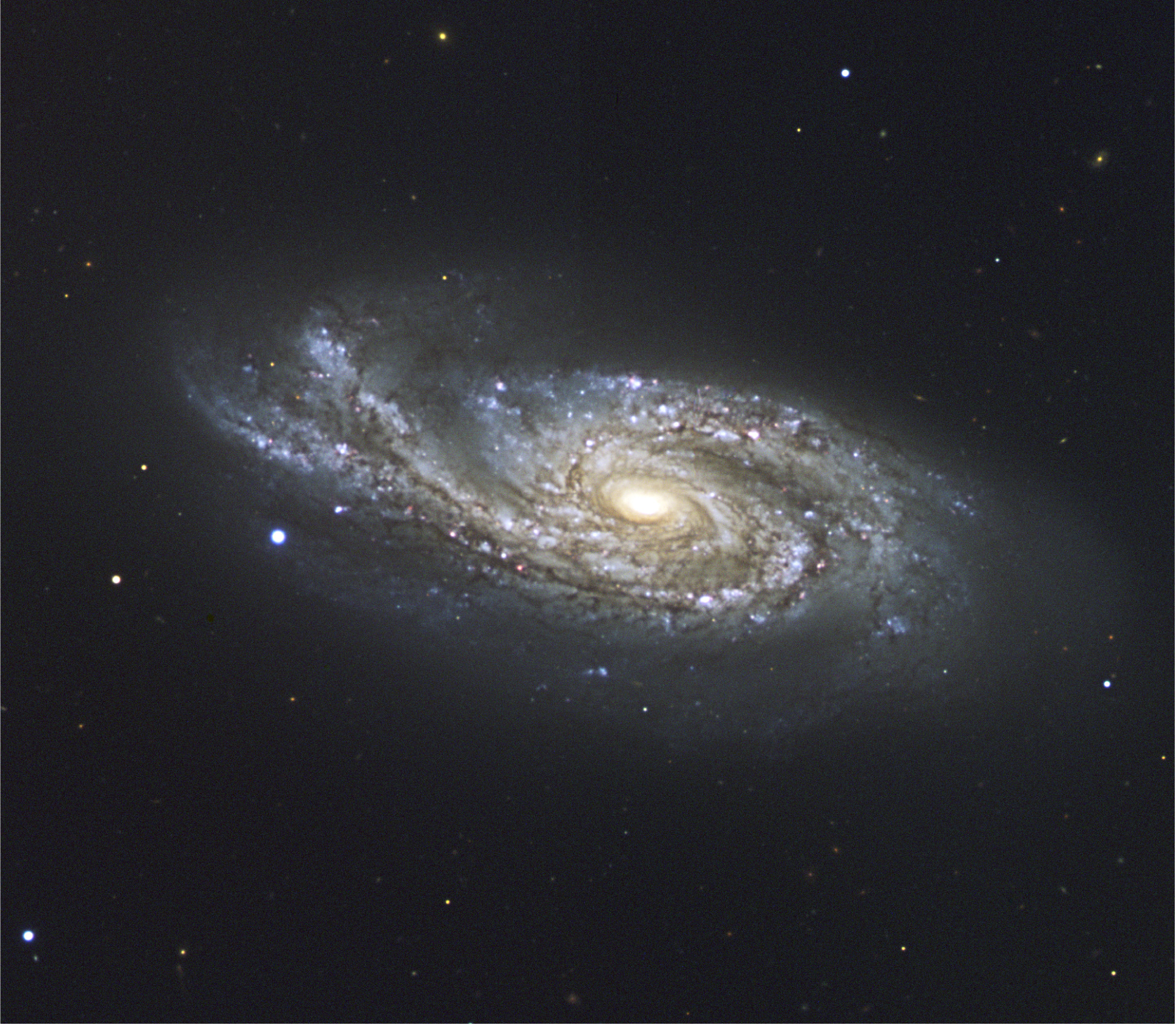
- NGC 908 imaged by the Very Large Telescope of ESO.

Observation data (J2000 epoch)
- Constellation: Cetus
- Right ascension: 02^{h} 23^{m} 04.6^{s}
- Declination: −21° 14′ 02″
- Redshift: 1,509±5 km/s
- Distance: 56.0 ± 5.7 Mly (17.2 ± 1.7 Mpc)
- Group or cluster: NGC 908 group
- Apparent magnitude (V): 10.2

Characteristics
- Type: SA(s)c
- Apparent size (V): 6.1′ × 2.7′

Other designations
- UGCA 27, MCG -04-06-035, PGC 9057

NGC 908 is an unbarred spiral galaxy in the constellation Cetus. It was discovered on 20 September 1786 by William Herschel. This galaxy is 56 million light years away from Earth. It is the main galaxy in the NGC 908 group, which also includes NGC 899, NGC 907, and IC 223.

== Appearance ==
NGC 908 has vigorous star formation and is a starburst galaxy. The galaxy has a three-arm spiral pattern; two of its arms have peculiar morphology. The galaxy has a bright central bulge. Clusters of young stars and star-forming knots can be seen in the arms. Starburst activity and the peculiar morphology of the galaxy indicate it had a close encounter with another galaxy, although none are visible now.

== Variable stars ==
Two supernovae have been observed in NGC 908:

- SN 1994ai (Type Ic, mag. 17) was discovered by Robert McNaught on 20 December 1994.
- SN 2006ce (Type Ia, mag. 12.4) was discovered by Berto Monard on 10 May 2006.

Also, one luminous blue variable has been observed in this galaxy: AT 2021ablz (type LBV, mag. 20.6) was discovered by Pan-STARRS on 14 October 2021.

== See also ==
- List of NGC objects (1–1000)
