= NGC 676 =

Galaxy in the constellation Pisces

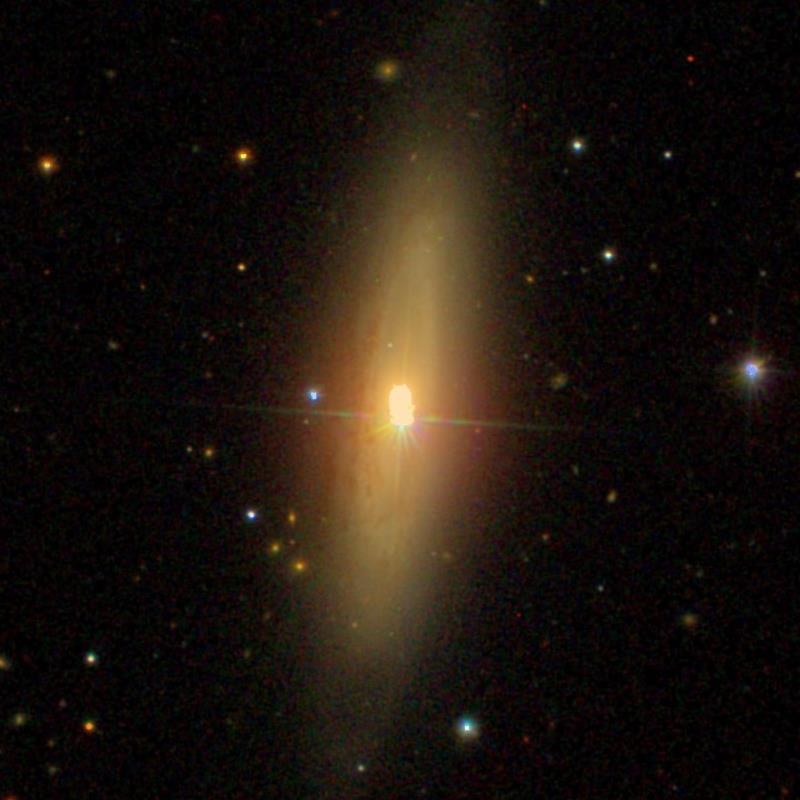
- NGC 676 galaxy seen by Sloan Digital Sky Survey. Diffraction spikes are due to the star BD +04 0244, superposed on the nucleus.

Observation data (J2000 epoch)
- Constellation: Pisces
- Right ascension: 01^{h} 48^{m} 57.3148^{s}
- Declination: +05° 54′ 27.082″
- Redshift: 0.005023
- Distance: 18.7 Mpc (61 Mly)
- Apparent magnitude (V): 10.5 +/- 0.4

Characteristics
- Type: S0/a: edge-on
- Size: ~88,700 ly (27.20 kpc) (estimated)
- Apparent size (V): 4.0′ × 1.2′

Other designations
- Ark 057, UGC 1270, MCG +01-05-034, PGC 6656, CGCG 412-028

NGC 676 is a lenticular Seyfert 2 galaxy in the constellation Pisces. Its velocity with respect to the cosmic microwave background is 1217 ± 20 km/s, which corresponds to a Hubble distance of 58.6 ± 4.2 Mly (17.96 ± 1.29 Mpc). In addition, two non redshift measurements give a distance of 61.0 ± 2.6 Mly (18.7 ± 0.8 Mpc). The galaxy was discovered by German-British astronomer William Herschel on 30 September 1786.

NGC 676 can be seen near the star α Piscium. Located close to the celestial equator, it is visible from both hemispheres. BD +04 0244, a star with a visual magnitude of 10.44, is superposed 5.1 arc seconds south-southwest of the nucleus. It is one of the 621 galaxies described in Marat Arakelian's catalog of high-surface-brightness galaxies.

== Image Gallery ==
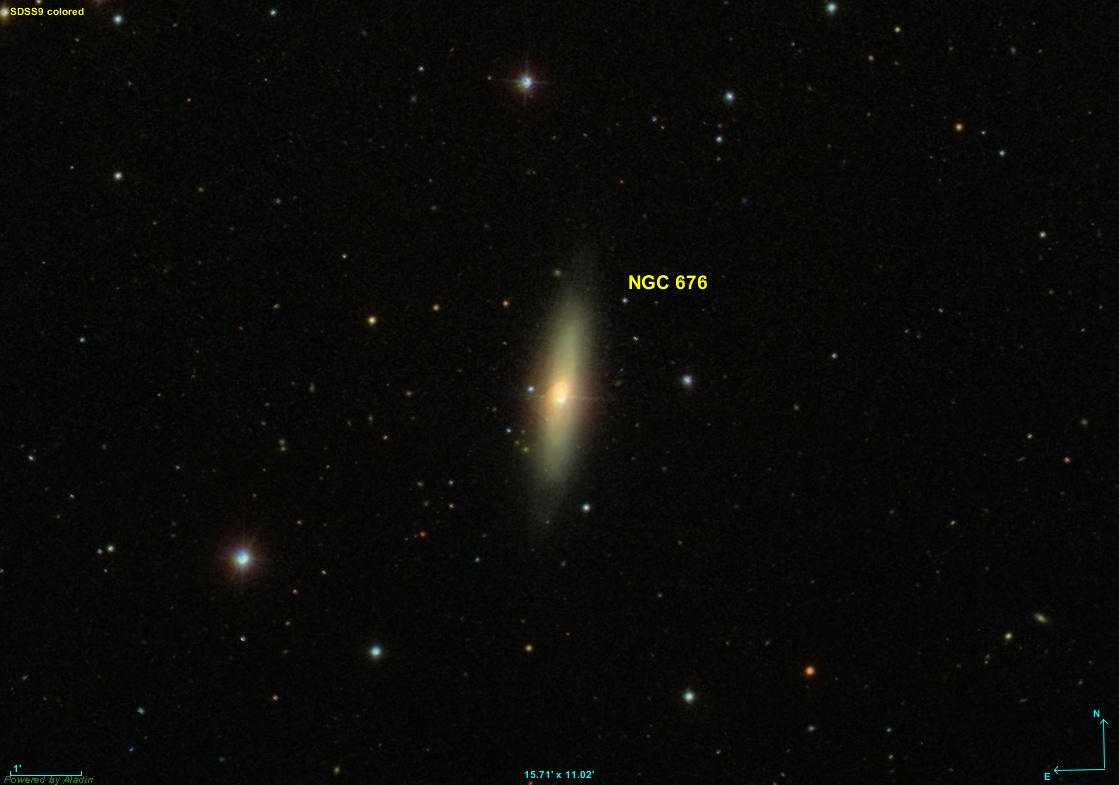
NGC 676 (SDSS)

== See also ==
- Spiral galaxy
- List of NGC objects (1–1000)
