= NGC 4559 =

Galaxy in the constellation Coma Berenicies

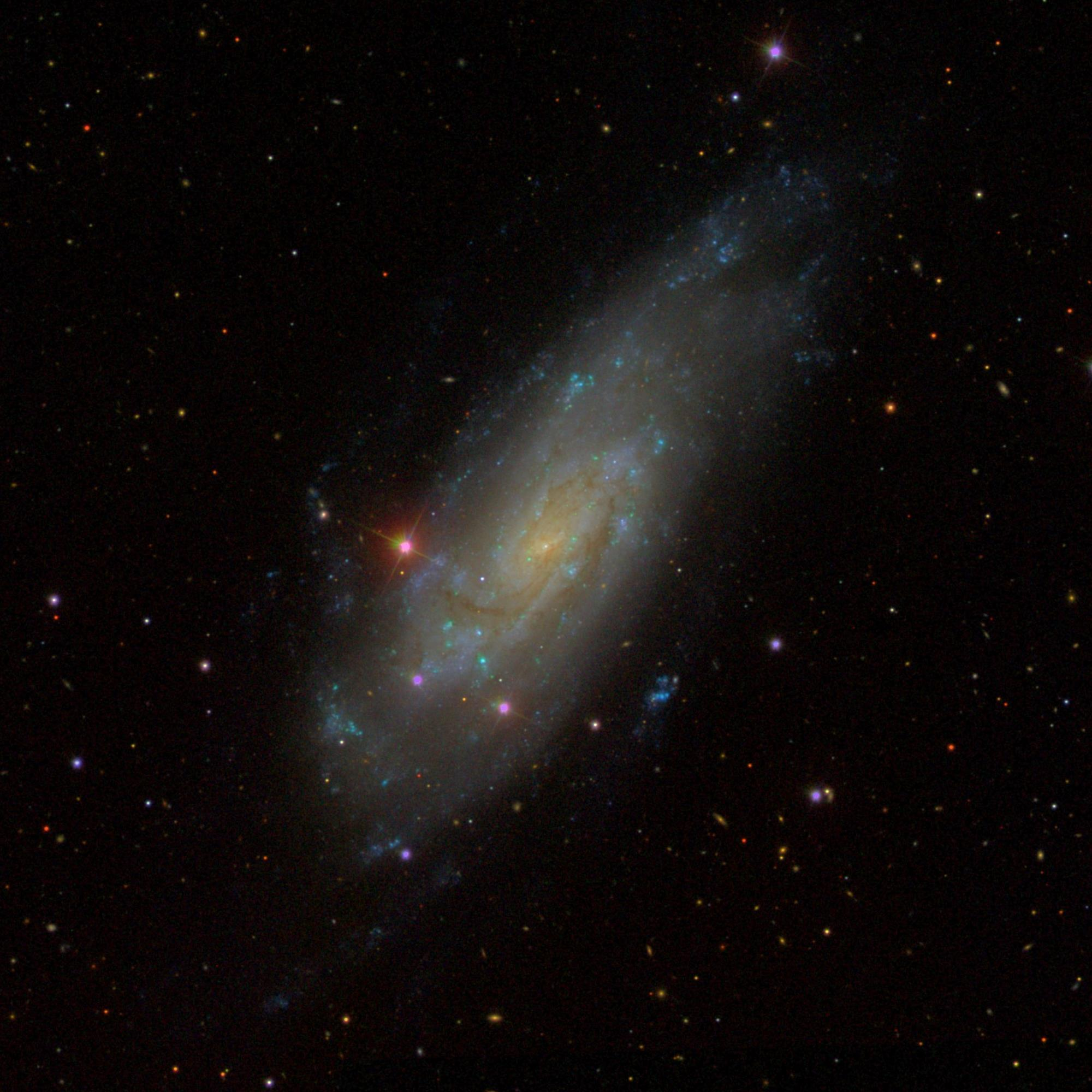
- NGC 4559 imaged by the Sloan Digital Sky Survey

Observation data (J2000 epoch)
- Constellation: Coma Berenices
- Right ascension: 12^{h} 35^{m} 57.6285^{s}
- Declination: +27° 57′ 35.851″
- Redshift: 0.002715±0.000002
- Heliocentric radial velocity: 814±1 km/s
- Distance: 24.56 ± 1.58 Mly (7.530 ± 0.483 Mpc)
- Apparent magnitude (V): 9.6

Characteristics
- Type: SAB(rs)cd
- Size: ~92,900 ly (28.48 kpc) (estimated)
- Apparent size (V): 10.7′ × 4.4′

Other designations
- HOLM 423A, IRAS 12334+2814, UGC 7766, MCG +05-30-030, PGC 42002, CGCG 159-024, C 36

NGC 4559 is an intermediate barred spiral galaxy with a structure in the constellation Coma Berenices. Alternatively, it is known as Caldwell 36. It was discovered by German-British astronomer William Herschel on 11 April 1785. Its velocity with respect to the cosmic microwave background is 1,096±20 km/s, which corresponds to a Hubble distance of 52.7 ± 3.8 Mly (16.17 ± 1.17 Mpc). However, 26 non-redshift measurements give a much closer distance of 24.56 ± 1.58 Mly (7.530 ± 0.483 Mpc). NGC 4559 is a member of the Coma I Group of galaxies.

The morphological classification of NGC 4559 is SAB(rs)cd, indicating a barred spiral galaxy (SAB) with a weak inner ring structure (rs) and loosely wound spiral arms (cd). From the perspective of the Earth, NGC 4559 is inclined at an angle of 67° to the plane of the sky. It has a fairly high star formation rate, estimated at 1.3 M_{☉}·yr^{−1}

== Features ==
One supernova has been recorded in NGC 4559: SN 1941A (Type II-L, mag. 13.2) was discovered by Rebecca Jones on 24 February 1941, and after checking previous photographs of the galaxy, it was determined that the supernova was visible starting 5 February 1941.

NGC 4559 is home to the luminous blue variable AT 2016blu (also known as PSN J12355230+2755559, or as NGC 4559OT). It was discovered by the Lick Observatory Supernova Search (LOSS) on 11 January 2012. It experiences repeated supernova-like outbursts: first when discovered, then again in 2014, 2016, 2017, 2018, 2019, 2020, 2021, 2022, 2024, 2025, and 2026.

The galaxy includes an ultraluminous X-ray source, which is located in a star forming region. This may be a black hole accreting from a high-mass donor star in its supergiant phase.

== See also ==
- Messier 99 – a similar spiral galaxy
- List of NGC objects (4001–5000)

== Gallery ==
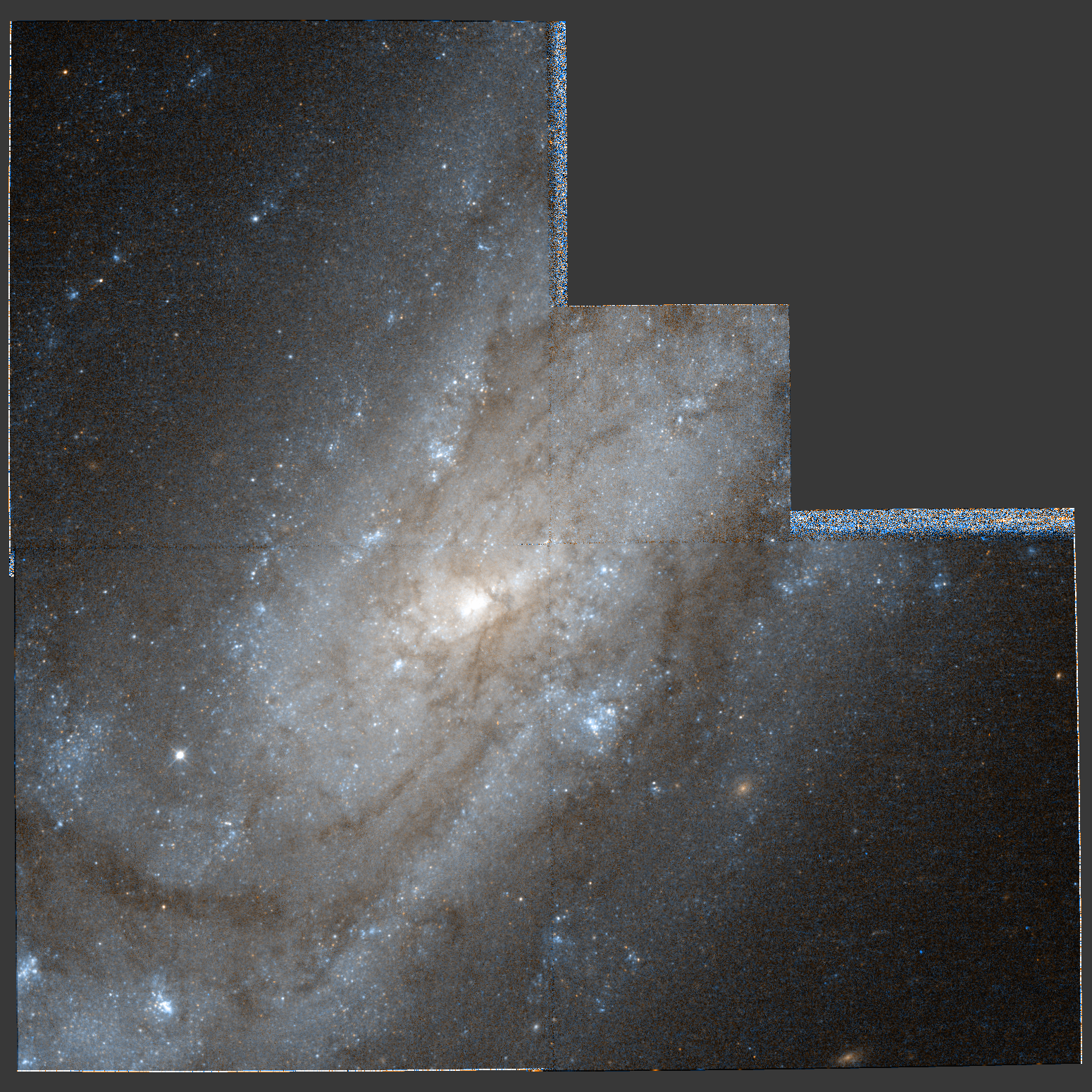
Hubble Space Telescope showing the inner structure

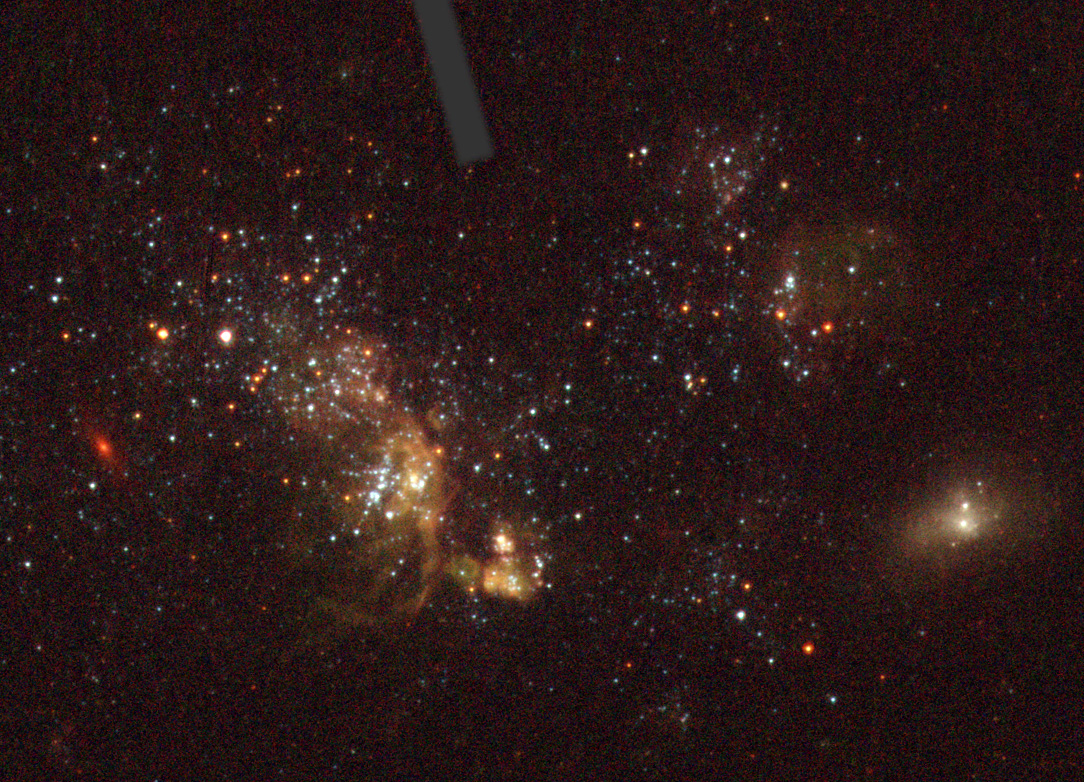
Hubble image of IC 3550, located in NGC 4559.
