= 15 Sagittarii =

Star in the constellation Sagittarius

Observation data Epoch J2000 Equinox J2000
- Constellation: Sagittarius
- Right ascension: 18^{h} 15^{m} 12.90641^{s}
- Declination: −20° 43′ 41.7738″
- Apparent magnitude (V): 5.37

Characteristics
- Spectral type: O9.7 Iab or B0 Iab
- B−V color index: 0.007±0.004

Astrometry
Radial velocity (R_{v})	−6.3±2.8 km/s
Proper motion (μ)	RA: +1.60 mas/yr Dec.: −1.51 mas/yr
Parallax (π)	0.10±0.45 mas
Distance	4,200±650 ly (1,300±200 pc)

Details

15 Sgr Aa
Mass	~30 M_{☉}
Radius	28.6±12.5 R_{☉}
Luminosity	4.47+3.85 −2.07×10^{5} L_{☉}
Surface gravity (log g)	3.10 cgs
Temperature	28,000±1,000 K
Rotational velocity (v sin i)	83±7 km/s

Other designations
- 15 Sgr, BD−20° 5054, HD 167264, HIP 89439, HR 6822, SAO 186543, WDS J18152-2044

Database references
SIMBAD	data

15 Sagittarii is a blue-hued binary star system in the southern zodiac constellation of Sagittarius. The estimated distance based upon photometry is around 4,200 ly (1,300 pc). It is faintly visible to the naked eye with an apparent visual magnitude of 5.37. The system is moving closer to the Sun with a heliocentric radial velocity of around −6 km/s.

Chini et al. (2012) identify this as a double-lined spectroscopic binary star system. It shows a stellar classification of O9.7 Iab, matching a massive O-type supergiant star. Along with the O-type star 16 Sgr (HD 167263), it is ionizing an H II region along the western edge of the molecular cloud L291.

The Washington Double Star Catalog lists four companions within a 2 arcsecond angular radius.
