= NGC 6164 and 6165 =

Emission nebula in the constellation Norma

NGC 6164/6165
Emission nebula
- Bipolar nebula
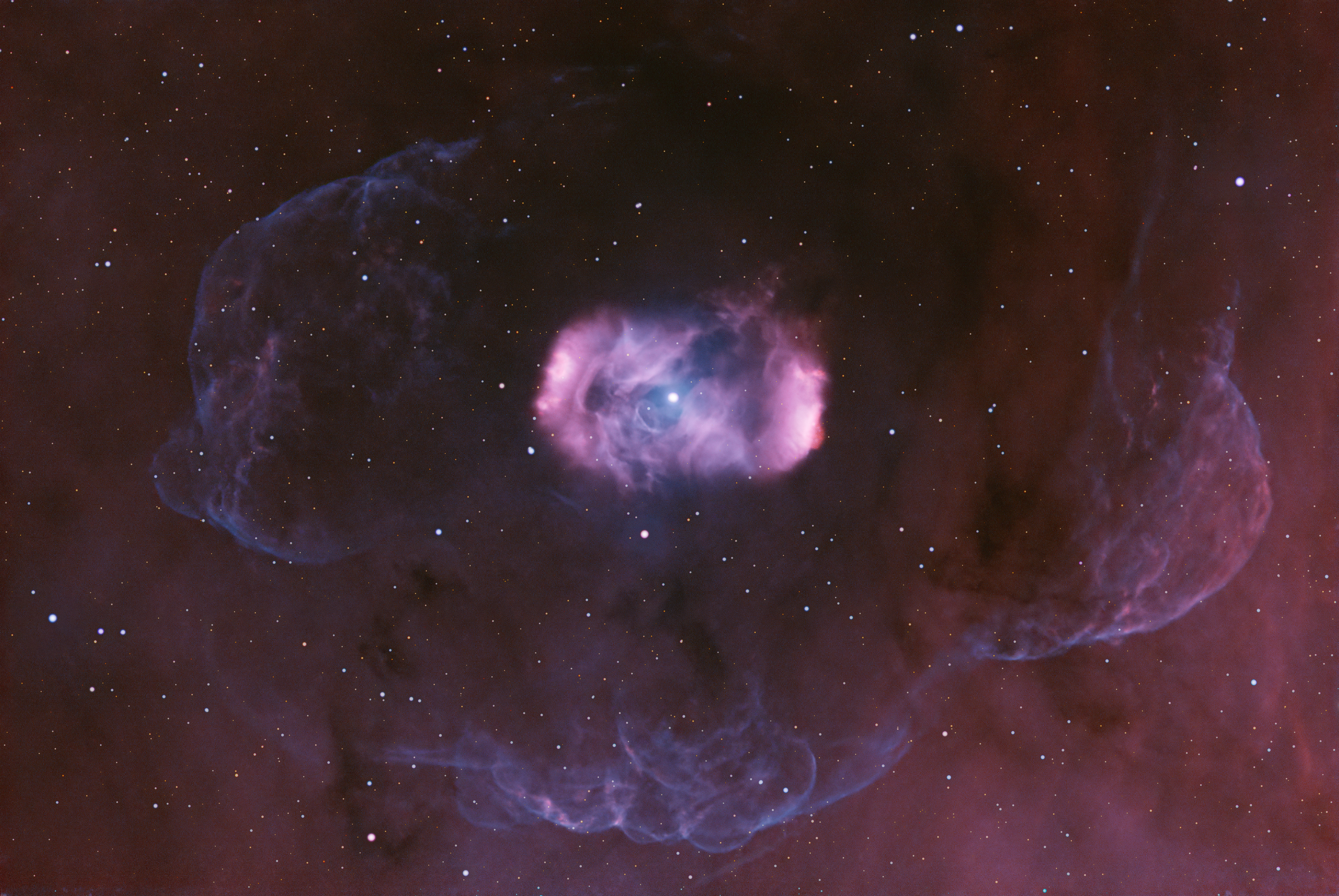
- NGC 6164 and 6165 are the nebula's two lobes to the left and right of the central star respectively.

Observation data: J2000 epoch
- Right ascension: 16^{h} 33^{m} 42^{s}
- Declination: −48° 04′ 47″
- Distance: 3,870 ly (1,188 pc)
- Apparent magnitude (V): 6.71
- Constellation: Norma

Physical characteristics
- Dimensions: 3.0' × 3.0'
- Designations: NGC 6164-65, AM 1630-475, ESO 226-EN 012

NGC 6164 and 6165 compose a bipolar emission nebula located 3,870 light years away in the constellation Norma. Known as the Dragon's Egg nebula due to its proximity to the Fighting Dragons of Ara, it was discovered by astronomer John Herschel on 1 July 1834.

== Physical characteristics ==
The nebula has two distinct lobes, with NGC 6164 constituting the one to the north of the central star, and NGC 6165, the one to the south. It is surrounded by a faint halo.

Its shape gives it the appearance of a planetary nebula resulting from the death of an old star similar to the Sun, but it is in reality an emission nebula. The gas from this nebula was ejected by the star located at its center, and this is also the source of its ionisation. In the Henry Draper Catalogue, this star is designated as HD 148937. It is a very young O-type star whose age is between three and four million years. Surrounded by its magnetic field, this star is about 40 times more massive than the Sun, and is expected to go supernova in three to four million years.

== See also ==
- List of diffuse nebulae
