= NGC 2366 =

Galaxy in the constellation Camelopardalis

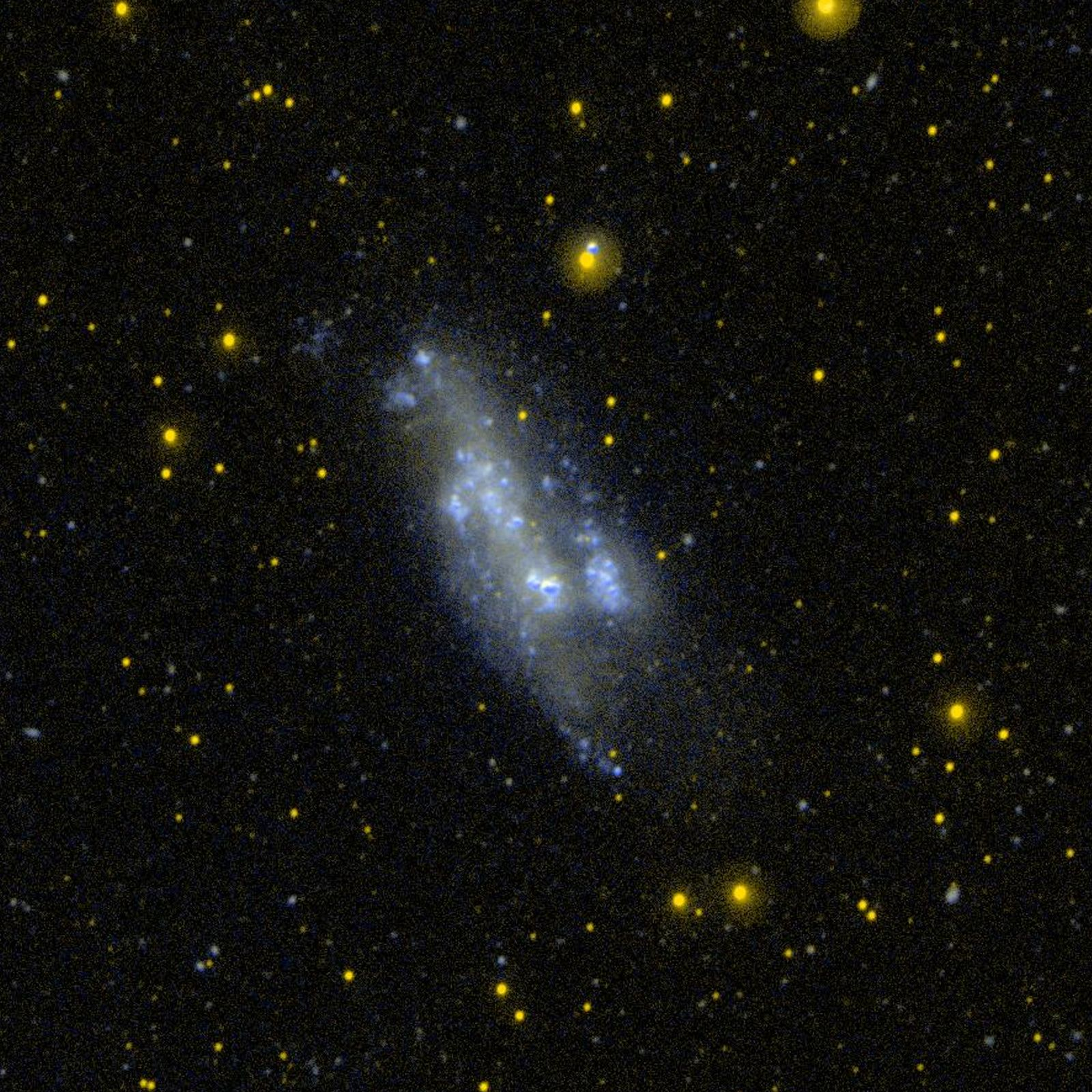
- GALEX image of NGC 2366

Observation data (J2000 epoch)
- Constellation: Camelopardalis
- Right ascension: 7^{h} 28^{m} 54.6^{s}
- Declination: +69° 12′ 57″
- Redshift: 80 ± 1 km/s
- Distance: 10 million light-years
- Apparent magnitude (V): 11.4

Characteristics
- Type: IB(s)m
- Apparent size (V): 8.1′ × 3.3′
- Notable features: The southern part of NGC 2366 is called Markarian 71.

Other designations
- UGC 3851, PGC 21102

NGC 2366 is a Magellanic barred irregular dwarf galaxy located in the constellation Camelopardalis.

At the southern end of NGC 2366 is the large, luminous HII region known as Markarian 71 (Mrk 71). To the west of Mrk 71 is another dwarf galaxy NGC 2363 which is interacting with NGC 2366. There has been confusion about the various components of NGC 2366 and its neighbouring galaxy NGC 2363. Corwins' notes remark that there are two galaxies with two NGC numbers clearly attached to each one: We shall just have to get used to calling the HII region "Markarian 71" (or one of its other names) since it is not N2363 as we've thought all these years.

Within Mrk 71, there are two super star clusters (SSC) which are named 'A' and 'B' or 'Knot A' and 'Knot B'.

Other names for the above components include: NGC 2366-I, NGC 2366-II, NGC 2366-III, NGC2366-A, NGC 2366-B, NGC 2366-C, NGC 2363-A, NGC 2363-B. NGC 2366 is an outlying member of the M81 Group.

== Super star clusters within Mrk 71 ==
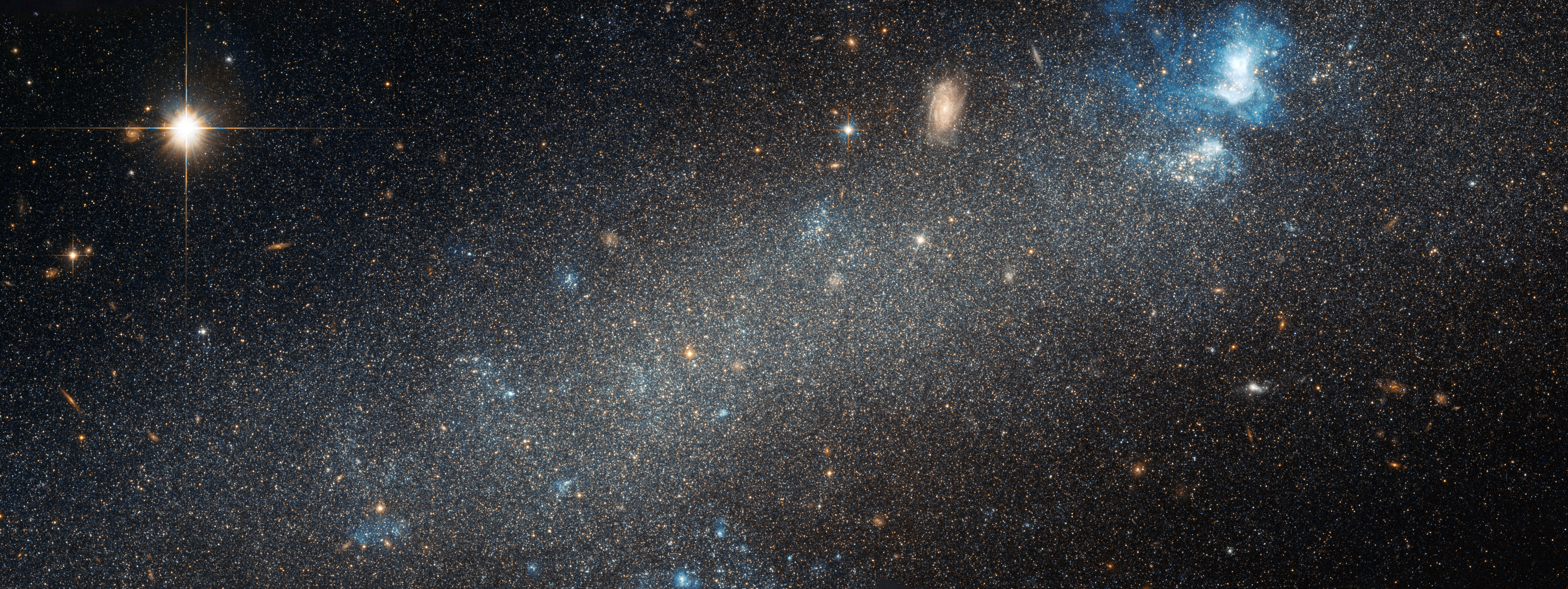
HST view of NGC 2366

NGC/Mrk71 is home to numerous young, gigantic blue stars, which in gas-rich star-forming regions, emit ultraviolet radiation that excites the hydrogen gas, making it glow. At a distance of approximately 10 million light years, it is close enough for astronomers to discern its individual stars.

Within Mrk 71 there are two super star clusters which will be referred to as Mrk 71 knot A (Knot A) and Mrk 71 knot B (Knot B).

Knot A has total stellar mass of approximately (1.3–1.4)×10^{5} solar masses. The absence of Wolf–Rayet stars in its spectra might well indicate that its age is no more than 3 Myrs, while an age of less than 1 Myr is given in a study by Drissen et al. 2000. Knot A hosts a massive, enshrouded SSC, in which no stellar features have been confirmed and that is still in its natal cloud. Knot A might well contain 'very massive stars' (VMS), which are O-type supergiants of 150–300 solar masses. These have short lifespans of 1–3 Myr and have been suggested as a reason why there are extreme stellar temperatures.

The hydrogen alpha luminosity measurement for Mrk 71, of which 90% is produced by Knot A, is given as 8.4×10^{39} ergs/s in a study by James et al. 2016.

Knot B has a lower mass of 1.5×10^{4} solar masses and an estimated age of 3–5 Myrs. UV spectral synthesis leads to the conclusion that there are approximately 800 B and 40 O stars present. Studies indicate that there might be up to 8 Wolf–Rayet stars present, which would set the age between 3–5 Myrs.

A superbubble appears to have been generated with strong shell morphology to the east and a blow-out region to the north, with expansion velocities of approximately 20 km/s. This is consistent with the substantial mechanical feedback generated by a massive, somewhat evolved SSC.

== The Nearest Green Pea Analog ==
In August 2017, a study was published in The Astrophysical Journal called: "Mrk 71/NGC 2366: The Nearest Green Pea Analog". This examines the links between NGC 2366 and the so-called Green Pea galaxies (GPs), some of which have recently been shown to be Lyman Continuum Emitters (LCEs). It presents a remarkable and serendipitous discovery that NGC 2366 is an excellent analog of the GPs. As NGC 2366 is located only 10 million light years away, it might provide a local example of an LCE.

Finding LCEs is crucial in the study of the Big Bang, as Lyman continuum photons (LyC) emissions are thought to be a mechanism for the reionisation of the Universe.

5 'extreme' GPs have recently been shown to be viable LCEs, with a LyC escape fraction of between 6–13%. This discovery doubled the number of low-redshift star-forming LCEs, which have been notoriously hard to detect.

Table 1 in Micheva et al. compares various properties of 'average' and 'extreme' GPs with NGC 2366/Mrk 71 using the wealth of existing data.

Some examples are:

i) The temperature of [OIII] (highly ionised oxygen) in extreme GPs is given as approximately 13,400–15500 K, compared with values of between 14,000 and 16,000 K for the Mrk 71 components.
ii) An extremely high equivalent width for [OIII] is shown in Knot A of 224.3±34.5 nm, compared with values of 80–200 nm for extreme GPs.
iii) The ratio of oxygen to hydrogen, which gives a value for an object's metallicity, is 7.89 in NGC 2263/MRK 71 and between 7.76 and 8.04 for extreme GPs.

The study concludes that NGC2366/Mrk 71 offers an unprecedentedly detailed look at the morphology and physical conditions of a potential LyC emitter, suggesting that LCEs might be numerous and commonplace.

== Dense CO in Mrk 71-A ==
A study named: "Dense CO in Mrk 71-A: Superwind Suppressed in a Young Super Star Cluster" was published in the Astrophysical Journal Letters in November 2017. One conclusion is: (quoting) "Since Mrk 71-A is a candidate Lyman continuum emitter, this implies that energy-driven superwinds may not be a necessary condition for the escape of ionizing radiation."

Observations were made using the Northern Extended Millimeter Array (NOEMA) telescope, looking for carbon monoxide. It revealed a compact, ~7 parsec molecular cloud.

== See also ==
- Citizen Science
- Galaxy zoo
