= Cosmic infrared background =

Infrared radiation caused by stellar dust

Cosmic infrared background is infrared radiation caused by stellar dust.

== History ==
Recognizing the cosmological importance of the darkness of the night sky (Olbers' paradox) and the first speculations on an extragalactic background light dates back to the first half of the 19th century. Despite its importance, the first attempts were made only in the 1950-60s to derive the value of the visual background due to galaxies, at that time based on the integrated starlight of these stellar systems. In the 1960s the absorption of starlight by dust was already taken into account, but without considering the re-emission of this absorbed energy in the infrared. At that time Jim Peebles pointed out that, in a Big Bang-created Universe, there must have been a cosmic infrared background (CIB) – different from the cosmic microwave background – that can account for the formation and evolution of stars and galaxies.

In order to produce today's metallicity, early galaxies must have been significantly more powerful than they are today. In the early CIB models the absorption of starlight was neglected, therefore in these models the CIB peaked between 1–10μm wavelengths. These early models have already shown correctly that the CIB was most probably fainter than its foregrounds, and so it was very difficult to observe. Later the discovery and observations of high luminosity infrared galaxies in the vicinity of the Milky Way showed, that the peak of the CIB is most likely at longer wavelengths (around 50μm), and its full power could be ~1−10% of that of the CMB.

As Martin Harwit emphasized, the CIB is very important in the understanding of some special astronomical objects, like quasars or ultraluminous infrared galaxies, which are very bright in the infrared. He also pointed out, that the CIB cause a significant attenuation for very high energy electrons, protons and gamma-rays of the cosmic radiation through inverse Compton scattering, photopion and electron-positron pair production.

In the early 1980s there were only upper limits available for the CIB. The real observations of the CIB began after the era of astronomical satellites working in the infrared, started by the Infrared Astronomy Satellite (IRAS), and followed by the Cosmic Background Explorer (COBE), the Infrared Space Observatory (ISO) and by the Spitzer Space Telescope. Exploration of the CIB was continued by the Herschel Space Observatory, launched in 2009.

The Spitzer wide area surveys have detected anisotropies in the CIB.

A summary on the history of CIB research can be found in the review papers by M.G. Hauser and E. Dwek (2001) and A. Kashlinsky (2005).

== Origin of the cosmic infrared background ==
One of the most important questions about the CIB is the source of its energy. In the early models the CIB was built up from the redshifted spectra of the galaxies found in our cosmic neighborhood. However, these simple models could not reproduce the observed features of the CIB. In the baryonic material of the Universe there are two sources of large amounts of energy: nuclear fusion and gravitation.

Nuclear fusion takes place inside the stars, and we can really see this light redshifted: this is the main source of the cosmic ultraviolet- and visual background. However, a significant amount of this starlight is not observed directly. Dust in the host galaxies can absorb it and re-emit it in the infrared, contributing to the CIB. Although most of today's galaxies contain little dust (e.g. elliptical galaxies are practically dustless), there are some special stellar systems even in our vicinity which are extremely bright in the infrared and at the same time faint (often almost invisible) in the optical. These ultraluminous infrared galaxies (ULIRGs) are just in a very active star formation period: they are just in a collision or in a merge with another galaxy. In the optical this is hidden by the huge amount of dust, and the galaxy is bright in the infrared due to the same reason. Galaxy collisions and mergers were more frequent in the cosmic past: the global star formation rate of the Universe peaked around redshift z = 1...2, and was 10 to 50 times the average value today. These galaxies in the z = 1...2 redshift range give 50 to 70 percent of the full brightness of the CIB.

Another important component of the CIB is the infrared emission by quasars. In these systems most of the gravitational potential energy of the matter falling into the central black hole is converted into X-rays, which would escape unless they are absorbed by the dust torus of the accretion disc. This absorbed light is again re-emitted in the infrared, and in total gives about 20–30% of the full power of the CIB; however at some specific wavelengths this is the dominant source of CIB energy.

A hitherto unrecognised population of intergalactic stars have been shown to explain the CIB as well as the other elements of the diffuse extragalactic background radiation. If intergalactic stars were to account for all of the background anisotropy, it would require a very large population, but this is not excluded by observations and could in fact also explain a fair part of the dark matter problem as well.

== Foregrounds ==
The most important foreground components of the CIB are the following:

- Zodiacal emission: the thermal emission of microscopic dust particles in the Solar System (from near- to mid-infrared)
- Thermal emission of small asteroids in the Solar System (from near- to mid-infrared)
- Galactic cirrus emission (far-infrared)
- Faint galactic stars (in the near-infrared, λ<20μm)
- Infrared emission of intracluster dust in the Local Group
- The cosmic microwave background - although physically it is not a "foreground" - is also considered as an important contaminating source of emission at very long infrared wavelengths (λ>300μm)

These components must be separated for a clear CIB detection.

== Observation of the cosmic infrared background ==
The detection of the CIB is both observationally and astrophysically very challenging. It has a very few characteristics which can be used to separate it from the foregrounds. One major point is, that the CIB must be isotropic, i.e. one has to measure the same CIB value all over the sky. It also lacks suspicious spectral features, since the final shape of its spectrum is the sum of the spectra of sources in the line of sight at various redshifts.

=== Direct detection ===
Direct measurements are simple, but very difficult. One just has to measure the total incoming power, and determine the contribution of each sky background component. The measurement has to be repeated in many directions to determine the contribution of the foregrounds. After the removal of all other components the remaining power – if it is the same constant value in any direction – is the CIB at that specific wavelength. In practice, one needs an instrument that is able to perform absolute photometry, i.e. it has some mechanism to fully block incoming light for an accurate zero level determination (cold shutter). Since the instrument parts, including the shutter, have non-zero temperatures and emit in the infrared, this is a very difficult task.

The first, and still the most extensive, direct CIB measurements were performed by the DIRBE instrument of the COBE satellite. After the removal of the precisely determined zodiacal emission contribution (which was based on the measured annual variation) the remaining power at longer infrared wavelength contained basically two components: the CIB and the Galactic cirrus emission. The infrared surface brightness of the Galactic cirrus must correlate with the neutral hydrogen column densities, since they originate from the same, low-density structure. After the removal of the HI-correlated part, the remaining surface brightness was identified as the cosmic infrared background at 60, 100, 140, and 240μm. At shorter wavelengths the CIB level could not be correctly determined.

Later, short-wavelength DIRBE measurements at 2.2 and 3.5μ were combined with the Two Micron Sky Survey (2MASS) source count data, and this led to the detection of the CIB at these two wavelengths.

=== Fluctuation studies ===
Since the CIB is an accumulated light of individual sources there is always a somewhat different number of sources in different directions in the field of view of the observer. This cause a variation (fluctuation) in the total amount of observed incoming flux among the different line of sights. These fluctuations are traditionally described by the two dimensional autocorrelation function, or by the corresponding Fourier power spectrum. The detection of fluctuations is easier than the direct CIB measurements, since one does not need to determine the absolute photometric zero point – fluctuations can be derived from differential measurements. On the other hand, fluctuations do not provide an immediate information on the CIB brightness. The measured fluctuation amplitudes either has to be confronted with a CIB model that has a prediction for the fluctuation / absolute level ratio, or it has to be compared with integrated differential light levels of source counts at the same wavelength.

The power spectrum of the CIB is usually presented in a spatial frequency [arcmin^{−1}] vs. fluctuation power [Jy^{2} sr^{−1}] diagram. It is contaminated by the presence of the power spectrum of foreground components, so that the total power spectrum is:

P(f) = Φ(f)x[P_{CIB}(f) + P_{cirr}(f) + P_{ze}(f) + P_{n}(f)]

where P(f), P_{CIB}(f), P_{cirr}, P_{ze}(f) and P_{n}(f) are the total, CIB, Galactic cirrus, zodiacal emission and noise (instrument noise) power spectrum components, respectively, and Φ is the power spectrum of the telescope's point spread function.

For most of the infrared zodiacal emission fluctuation are negligible in the "cosmic windows", far from the ecliptic plane.

In the far-infrared the CIB power spectrum can be effectively used to separate it from its strongest foreground, the Galactic cirrus emission. The cirrus emission has a characteristic power spectrum of a power-law (that of a fractal spatial structure) P(f) = P_{0}(f/f_{0})^{α}, where P is the fluctuation power at the spatial frequency f, P_{0} is the fluctuation power at the reference spatial frequency f_{0}, and α is the spectral index. α was found to be α≈-3, which is much steeper than the power spectrum of the CIB at low spatial frequencies. The cirrus component can be identified in the power spectrum at low spatial frequencies and then removed from the whole spatial frequency range. The remaining power spectrum – after a careful correction for instrument effects – should be that of the CIB.

Autocorrelation and power spectrum studies resulted in the CIB fluctuation amplitudes at 1.25, 2.2, 3.5, 12–100μm based on the COBE/DIRBE measurements, and later at 90 and 170μm, based on the observations of the ISOPHOT instrument of the Infrared Space Observatory. Recently, the clustering of the galaxies have also been identified in the power spectrum at 160μm using this method.

=== Source counts ===
Source counts gives the most extensive picture about the sources building up the CIB. In a source count one tries to detect as many point/compact sources in a certain field of view as possible: this is usually done at multiple wavelengths and is often complemented by other data, e.g. photometry at visual or sub-millimeter wavelengths. In this way, one has information on the broad band spectral characteristics of the detected sources, too. The detected point sources have to be distinguished from other contaminating sources, e.g. minor bodies in the Solar System, Galactic stars and cirrus knots (local density enhancements in the Galactic cirrus emission).

Source counts were important tasks for the recent infrared missions like 2MASS or the Infrared Space Observatory (ISO), and is still one of the most important questions the current and near future infrared space instruments (the Spitzer Space Telescope and the Herschel Space Observatory). While ISO was able to resolve about 3–10% of the total CIB light into individual sources (depending on the wavelength), Spitzer measurements have already detected ~30% of the CIB as sources, and this ratio is expected to be ~90% at some wavelengths with the Herschel Space Observatory.

Source count results support the "fast evolution" galaxy models. In these models galaxies nowadays look significantly different than they were at z=1...2, when they were coming through an intense star-formation phase. The source count results exclude the "steady state" scenarios, where z=1...2 galaxies look similar to those we see today in our cosmic neighborhood.

== See also ==
- Infrared cirrus
- Cosmic microwave background
- Cosmic X-ray background
