= Intergalactic star =

Star not gravitationally bound to any galaxy

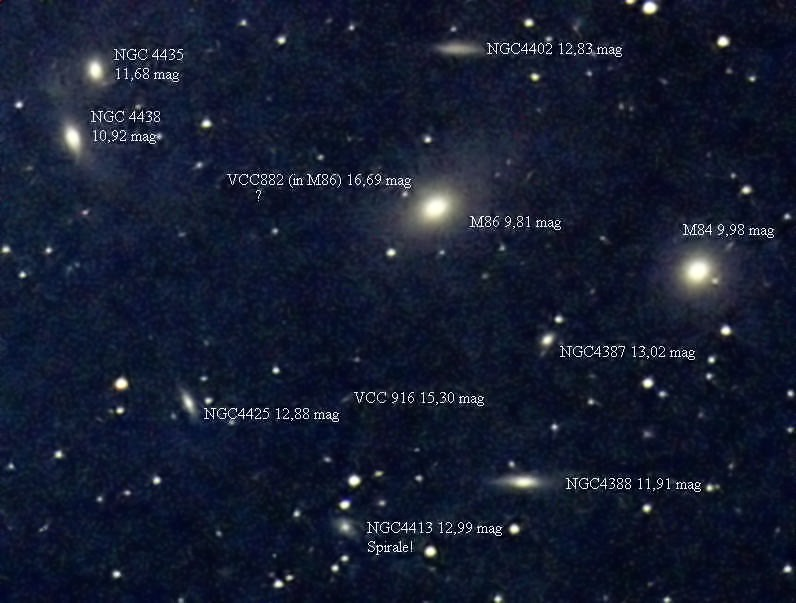
The Virgo Cluster of galaxies, where the phenomenon known as intergalactic stars was discovered

An intergalactic star, also known as an intracluster star or a rogue star, is a star not gravitationally bound to any galaxy. Although a source of much discussion in the scientific community during the late 1990s, intergalactic stars are now generally thought to have originated in galaxies, like other stars, before being expelled as the result of either galaxies colliding or of a multiple-star system traveling too close to a supermassive black hole, which are found at the center of many galaxies.

Collectively, intergalactic stars are referred to as the intracluster stellar population, or IC population for short, in the scientific literature.

== Discovery ==
The hypothesis that stars exist only in galaxies was disproven in January 1997 with the discovery of intergalactic stars. The first to be discovered were in the Virgo Cluster of galaxies, where some one trillion are now surmised to exist. Since then, ΛCDM simulations have been undertaken to further predict and expand knowledge of the origins of intergalactic star-forming regions.

== Formation ==
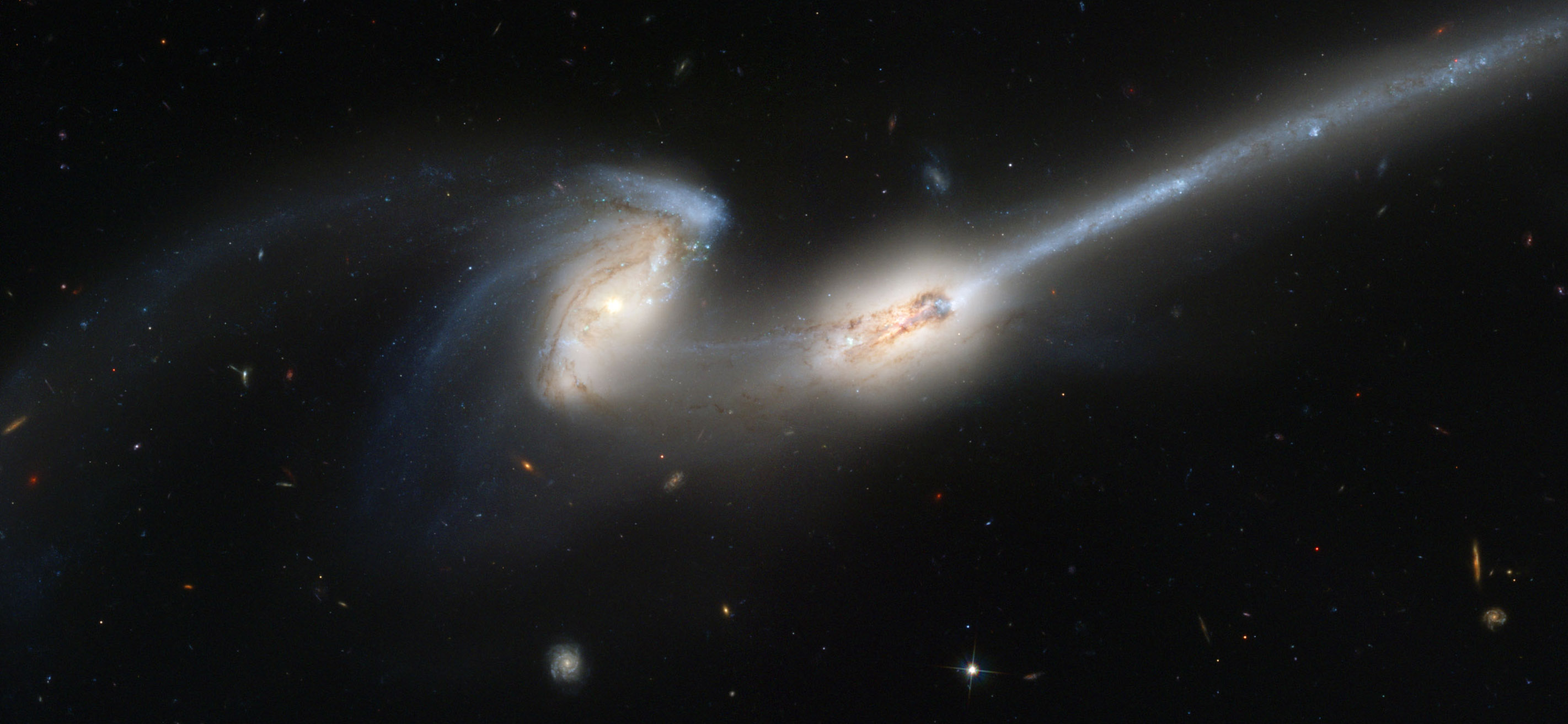
Collisions between galaxies are commonly thought to be a source of intergalactic stars.

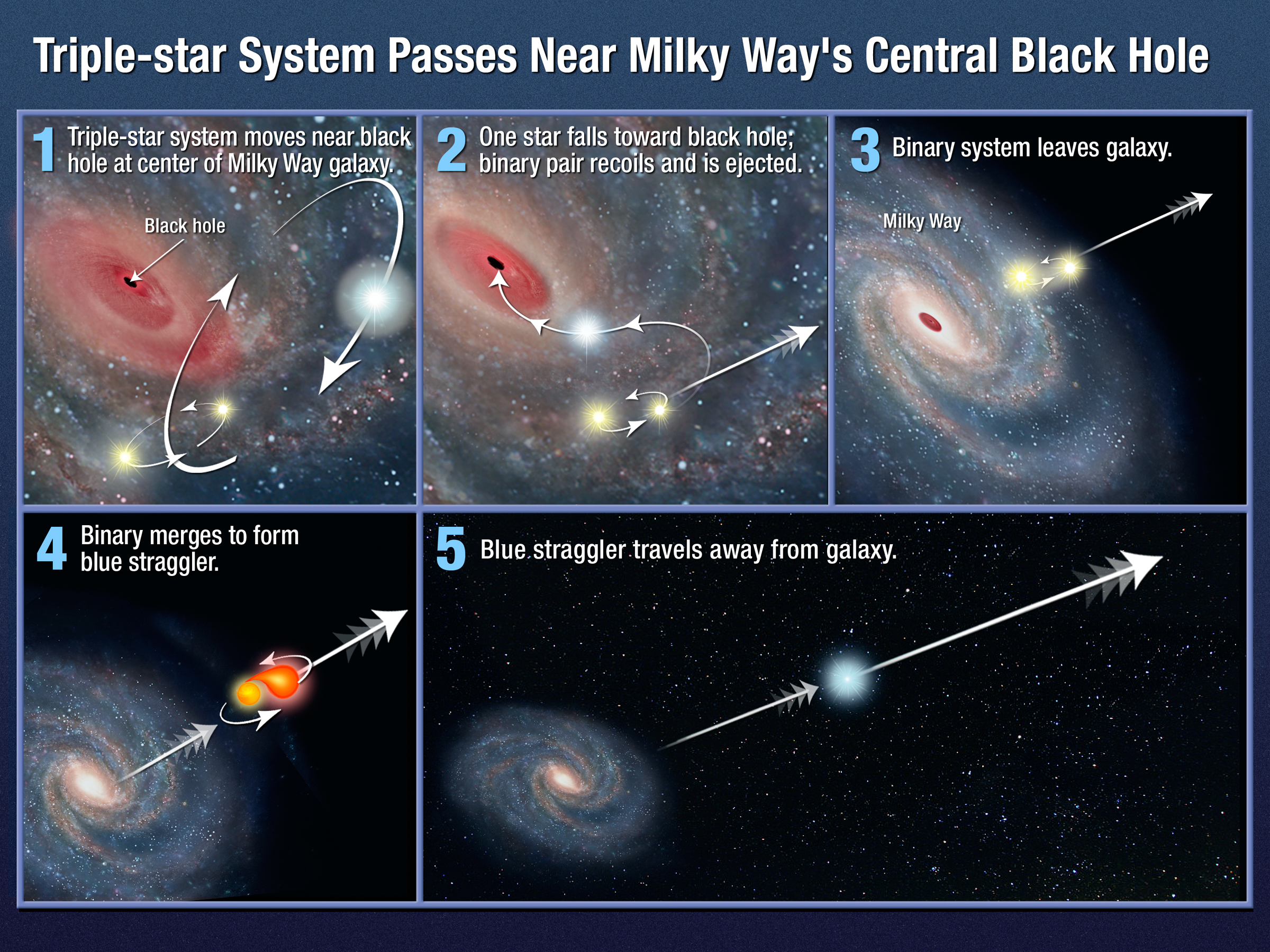
Proposed mechanisms for the ejection of intergalactic stars by supermassive black holes

The way these stars arise is still a mystery, but several scientifically credible hypotheses have been suggested and published by astrophysicists.

The most common hypothesis is that the collision of two or more galaxies can toss some stars out into the vast empty regions of intergalactic space. Although stars normally reside within galaxies, they can be expelled by gravitational forces when galaxies collide. It is commonly believed that intergalactic stars may primarily have originated from extremely small galaxies, since it is easier for stars to escape a smaller galaxy's gravitational pull, than that of a large galaxy. Also known as tidal stripping, these galaxies will fling low-mass stellar components from dense clusters to the intergalactic medium using strong tidal fields and produce intergalactic star populations. However, when large galaxies collide, some of the gravitational disturbances might also expel stars. Published in August 2015, a study of supernovae in intergalactic space suggested that the progenitor stars had been expelled from their host galaxies during a galactic collision between two giant ellipticals, as their supermassive black hole centres merged.

Another hypothesis, that is not mutually exclusive to the galactic collisions hypothesis, is that intergalactic stars were ejected from their galaxy of origin by a close encounter with the supermassive black hole in the galaxy center, should there be one. In such a scenario, it is likely that the intergalactic star(s) was originally part of a multiple star system where the other stars were pulled into the supermassive black hole and the soon-to-be intergalactic star was accelerated and ejected away at very high speeds. Such an event could theoretically accelerate a star to such high speeds that it becomes a hypervelocity star, thereby escaping the gravitational well of the entire galaxy. In this respect, model calculations (from 1988) predict the supermassive black hole in the center of our Milky Way galaxy to expel one star every 100,000 years on average.

== Observation history ==
In January 1997, the Hubble Space Telescope discovered a large number of intergalactic stars in the Virgo Cluster of galaxies. Another study, published later in January 1997, confirmed that astronomers had discovered a group of intergalactic planetary nebulae in the Fornax Cluster of galaxies in 1992 and 1993.

In 2005, at the Smithsonian Center for Astrophysics, Warren Brown and his team attempted to measure the speeds of hypervelocity stars by using the Doppler Technique, by which light is observed for the similar changes that occur in sound when an object is moving away or toward something. But the speeds found are only estimated minimums, as in reality their speeds may be larger than the speeds found by the researchers. "One of the newfound exiles is moving in the direction of the constellation Ursa Major at about 1.25 million mph with respect to the galaxy. It is 240,000 light-years away. The other is headed toward the constellation Cancer, outbound at 1.43 million miles per hour and 180,000 light-years away."

In the late 2000s, a diffuse glow from the intergalactic medium, but of unknown origin, was discovered. In 2012, it was suggested and shown that it might originate from intergalactic stars. Subsequent observations and studies have elaborated on the issue and described the diffuse extragalactic background radiation in more detail.

Some Vanderbilt astronomers report that they have identified more than 675 stars at the edge of the Milky Way, between the Andromeda Galaxy and the Milky Way. They argue that these stars are hypervelocity (intergalactic) stars that were ejected from the Milky Way's Galactic Center. These stars are red giants with a high metallicity (a measure of the proportion of chemical elements other than hydrogen and helium within a star) indicating an inner galactic origin, since stars outside the disks of galaxies tend to have low metallicity and are older.

Some recently discovered supernovae have been confirmed to have exploded hundreds of thousands of light-years from the nearest star or galaxy. Most intergalactic star candidates found in the neighborhood of the Milky Way seem not to have an origin in the Galactic Center but in the Milky Way disk or elsewhere.

In the late 2010s, an in-depth search for intergalactic star-forming emissions was conducted using SITELLE. The spectrometer was used to detect ionized gas structures in the selected galaxy system and analyze their kinematic properties.

== Mass ==
In 2005, the Spitzer Space Telescope revealed a hitherto unknown infrared component in the background from the cosmos. Since then, several other anisotropies at other wavelengths – including blue and x-ray – have been detected with other space telescopes and they are now collectively described as the diffuse extragalactic background radiation. Several explanations have been discussed by scientists, but in 2012, it was suggested and shown how for the first time this diffuse radiation might originate from intergalactic stars. If that is the case, they might collectively comprise as much mass as that found in the galaxies. A population of such magnitude was at one point thought to explain the photon underproduction crisis, and may explain a significant part of the dark matter problem. It was also suggested that the tidal destruction of intermediate-mass galaxies may have been a plausible contributor to the existence and evolution of intracluster light (ICL).

== Known locations ==
The first intergalactic stars were discovered in the Virgo Cluster of galaxies. These stars are notable for their isolation, residing approximately 300,000 light-years away from the nearest galaxy. Despite the difficulty in determining their exact mass, it is estimated that intergalactic stars constitute around 10 percent of the mass of the Virgo cluster, potentially outweighing any of its 2,500 galaxies

In 2012, astronomers identified approximately 675 rogue stars at the edge of the Milky Way, towards the Andromeda Galaxy. These stars were likely ejected from the Milky Way's core by interactions with the central supermassive black hole. The study led by Kelly Holley-Bockelmann and Lauren Palladino from Vanderbilt University highlighted the unusual red coloration and high velocities of these stars, indicating their dramatic journey from the galactic center.

== See also ==
- Blue straggler – Main sequence star that is more luminous and bluer than expected
- HE 0437-5439 – Hypervelocity star in the constellation Dorado
- Intergalactic dust – Cosmic dust in between galaxies in intergalactic space
- Intracluster medium – Superheated plasma that permeates a galaxy cluster
- Rogue planet – Planet not gravitationally bound to a star, or interstellar planet
- Rogue black hole – Interstellar or intergalactic object
- Stellar kinematics – Study of the movement of stars

== Sources ==
- Graham, M. L.; Sand, D. J.; Zaritsky, D.; Pritchet, C. J. (2 July 2015). "Confirmation of Hostless Type Ia Supernovae Using Hubble Space Telescope Imaging". The Astrophysical Journal. 807 (1): 83. arXiv:1505.03407. Bibcode:2015ApJ...807...83G. doi:10.1088/0004-637X/807/1/83. ISSN 1538-4357.
- Sand, David J.; Graham, Melissa L.; Bildfell, Chris; et al. (22 February 2011). "Intracluster Supernovae in the Multi-epoch Nearby Cluster Survey". The Astrophysical Journal. 729 (2): 142. arXiv:1011.1310. Bibcode:2011ApJ...729..142S. doi:10.1088/0004-637X/729/2/142. ISSN 0004-637X.
