= Hubble Deep Field =

Multiple exposure image of deep space in the constellation Ursa Major

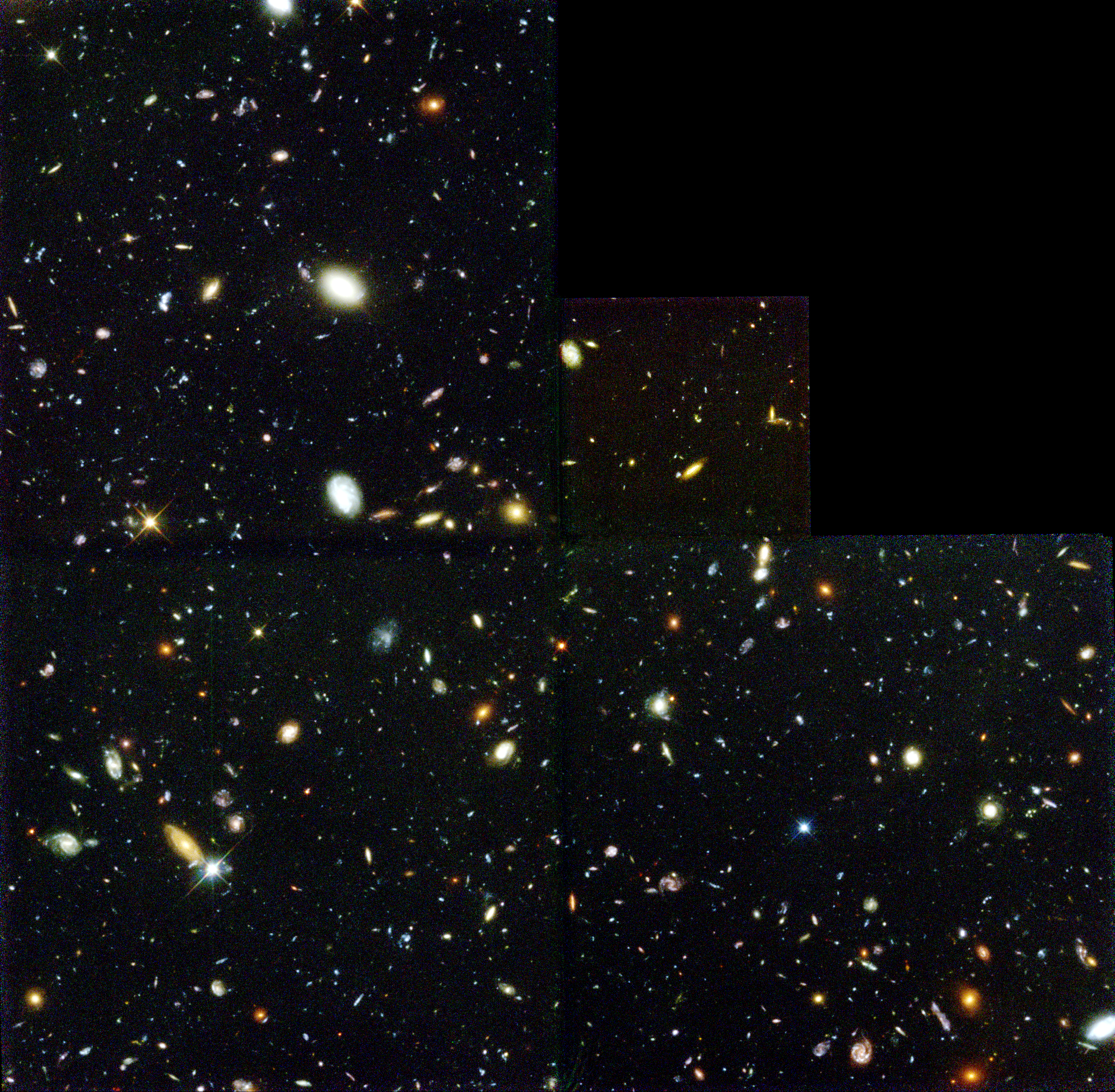
The Hubble Deep Field

The Hubble Deep Field (HDF) is an image of a small region in the constellation Ursa Major, constructed from a series of observations by the Hubble Space Telescope. It covers an area about 2.6 arcminutes on a side, about one 24-millionth of the whole sky, which is equivalent in angular size to a tennis ball at a distance of 100 metres. The image was assembled from 342 separate exposures taken with the Space Telescope's Wide Field and Planetary Camera 2 over ten consecutive days between December 18 and 28, 1995.

The field is so small that only a few foreground stars in the Milky Way lie within it; thus, almost all of the 3,000 objects in the image are galaxies, some of which are among the youngest and most distant known. By revealing such large numbers of very young galaxies, the HDF has become a landmark image in the study of the early universe.

Three years after the HDF observations were taken, a region in the south celestial hemisphere was imaged in a similar way and named the Hubble Deep Field South. The similarities between the two regions strengthened the belief that the universe is uniform over large scales and that the Earth occupies a typical region in the Universe (the cosmological principle). A wider but shallower survey was also made as part of the Great Observatories Origins Deep Survey. In 2004 a deeper image, known as the Hubble Ultra-Deep Field (HUDF), was constructed from a few months of light exposure. The HUDF image was at the time the most sensitive astronomical image ever made at visible wavelengths, and it remained so until the Hubble eXtreme Deep Field (XDF) was released in 2012.

== Conception ==
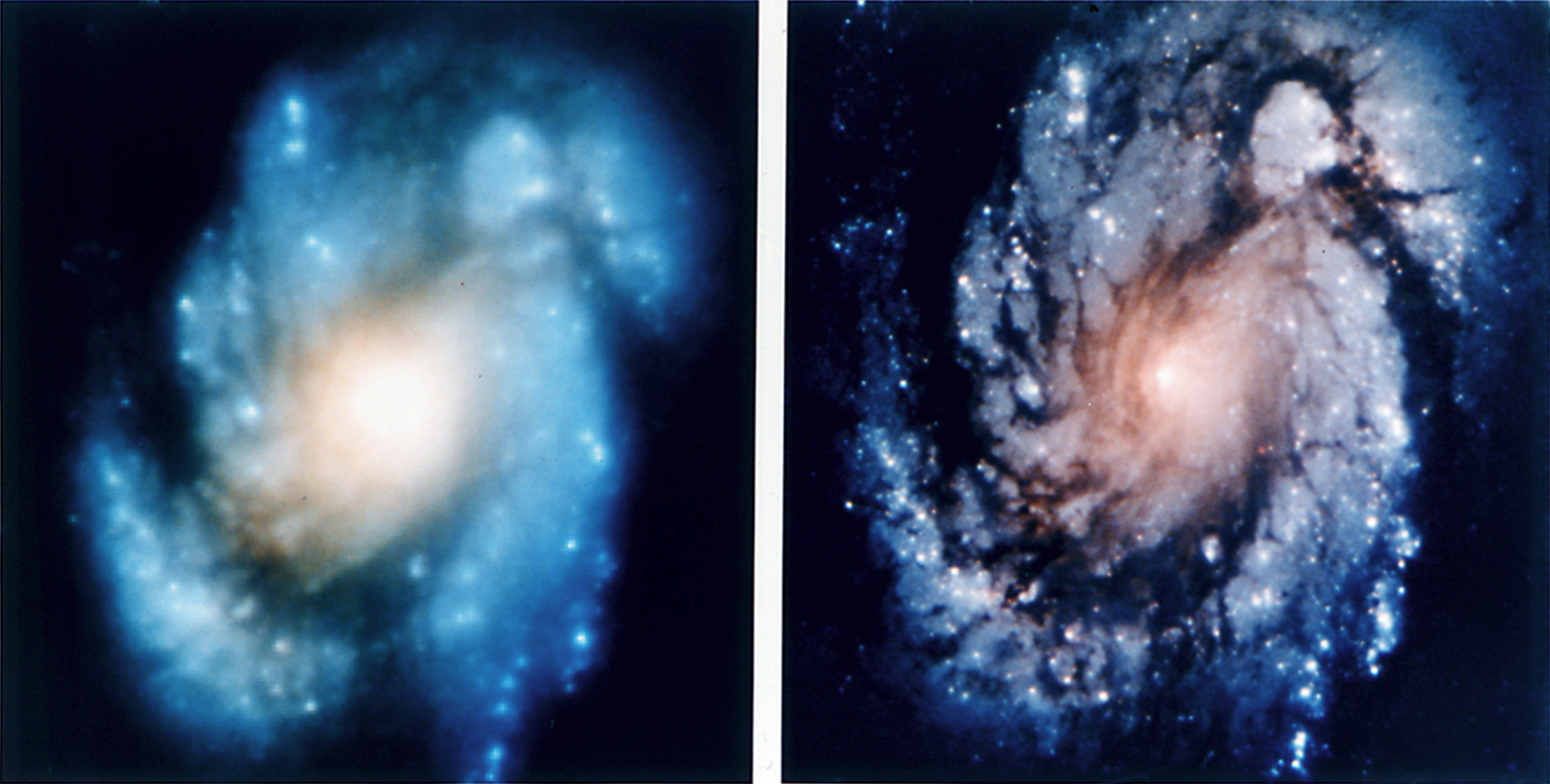
The dramatic improvement in Hubble's imaging capabilities after corrective optics were installed encouraged attempts to obtain very deep images of distant galaxies.

One of the key aims of the astronomers who designed the Hubble Space Telescope was to use its high optical resolution to study distant galaxies to a level of detail that was not possible from the ground. Positioned above the atmosphere, Hubble avoids atmospheric airglow allowing it to take more sensitive visible and ultraviolet light images than can be obtained with seeing-limited ground-based telescopes (when good adaptive optics correction at visible wavelengths becomes possible, 10 m ground-based telescopes may become competitive). Although the telescope's mirror suffered from spherical aberration when the telescope was launched in 1990, it could still be used to take images of more distant galaxies than had previously been obtainable. Because light takes billions of years to reach Earth from very distant galaxies, we see them as they were billions of years ago; thus, extending the scope of such research to increasingly distant galaxies allows a better understanding of how they evolve.

After the spherical aberration was corrected during Space Shuttle mission STS-61 in 1993, the improved imaging capabilities of the telescope were used to study increasingly distant and faint galaxies. The Medium Deep Survey (MDS) used the Wide Field and Planetary Camera 2 (WFPC2) to take deep images of random fields while other instruments were being used for scheduled observations. At the same time, other dedicated programs focused on galaxies that were already known through ground-based observation. All of these studies revealed substantial differences between the properties of galaxies today and those that existed several billion years ago.

Up to 10% of the HST's observation time is designated as Director's Discretionary (DD) Time, and is typically awarded to astronomers who wish to study unexpected transient phenomena, such as supernovae. Once Hubble's corrective optics were shown to be performing well, Robert Williams, the then-director of the Space Telescope Science Institute, decided to devote a substantial fraction of his DD time during 1995 to the study of distant galaxies. A special Institute Advisory Committee recommended that the WFPC2 be used to image a "typical" patch of sky at a high galactic latitude, using several optical filters. A working group was set up to develop and implement the project.

== Target selection ==
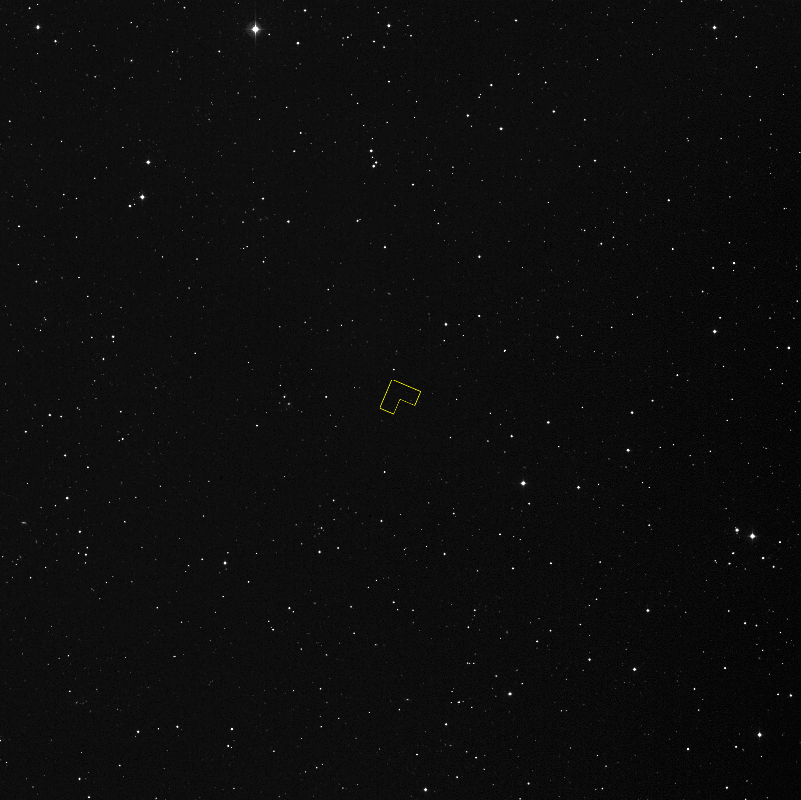
The HDF is at the centre of this image of one degree of sky. The Moon as seen from Earth would fill roughly one quarter of this image.

The field selected for the observations needed to fulfill several criteria. It had to be at a high galactic latitude because dust and obscuring matter in the plane of the Milky Way's disc prevents observations of distant galaxies at low galactic latitudes (see Zone of Avoidance). The target field had to avoid known bright sources of visible light (such as foreground stars), and infrared, ultraviolet, and X-ray emissions, to facilitate later studies at many wavelengths of the objects in the deep field, and also needed to be in a region with a low background infrared cirrus, the diffuse, wispy infrared emission believed to be caused by warm dust grains in cool clouds of hydrogen gas (H I regions).

These criteria restricted the field of potential target areas. It was decided that the target should be in Hubble's continuous viewing zones: the areas of sky that are not occulted by the Earth or the moon during Hubble's orbit. The working group decided to concentrate on the northern continuous viewing zone, so that northern-hemisphere telescopes such as the Keck telescopes, the Kitt Peak National Observatory telescopes, and the Very Large Array (VLA) could conduct follow-up observations.

Twenty fields satisfying these criteria were identified, from which three optimal candidate fields were selected, all within the constellation of Ursa Major. Radio snapshot observations with the VLA ruled out one of these fields because it contained a bright radio source, and the final decision between the other two was made on the basis of the availability of guide stars near the field: Hubble observations normally require a pair of nearby stars on which the telescope's Fine Guidance Sensors can lock during an exposure, but given the importance of the HDF observations, the working group required a second set of back-up guide stars. The field that was eventually selected is located at a right ascension of 12^{h} 36^{m} 49.4^{s} and a declination of +62° 12′ 58″; it is about 2.6 arcminutes in width, or 1/12 the width of the Moon. The area is about 1/24,000,000 of the total area of the sky.

== Observations ==
The HDF was in Hubble's northern Continuous Viewing Zone, as shown by this diagram.

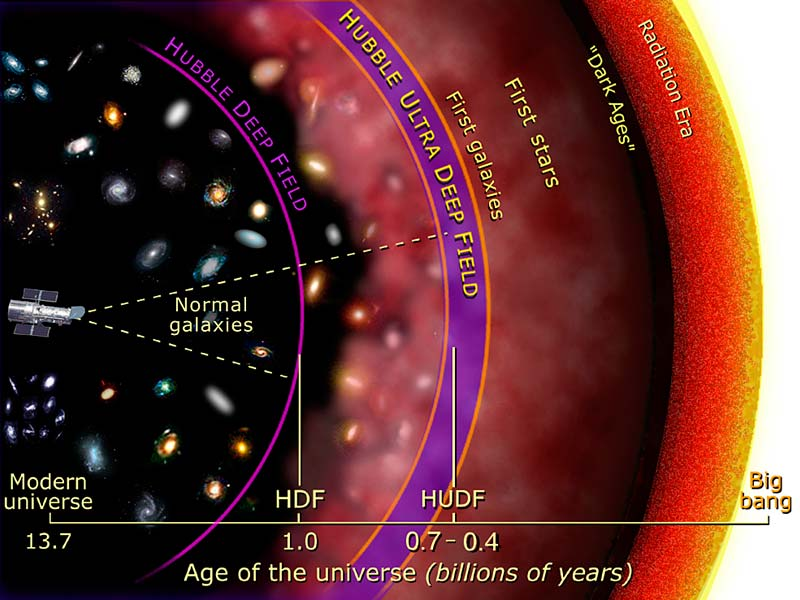
Diagram illustrating comparative sampling distance of the HDF and the 2004 Hubble Ultra-Deep Field

Once a field was selected, an observing strategy was developed. An important decision was to determine which filters the observations would use; WFPC2 is equipped with 48 filters, including narrowband filters isolating particular emission lines of astrophysical interest, and broadband filters useful for the study of the colors of stars and galaxies. The choice of filters to be used for the HDF depended on the throughput of each filter—the total proportion of light that it allows through—and the spectral coverage available. Filters with bandpasses overlapping as little as possible were desirable.

In the end, four broadband filters were chosen, centred at wavelengths of 300 nm (near-ultraviolet), 450 nm (blue light), 606 nm (red light) and 814 nm (near-infrared). Because the quantum efficiency of Hubble's detectors at 300 nm wavelength is quite low, the noise in observations at this wavelength is primarily due to CCD noise rather than sky background; thus, these observations could be conducted at times when high background noise would have harmed the efficiency of observations in other passbands.

Between December 18 and 28, 1995—during which time Hubble orbited the Earth about 150 times—342 images of the target area in the chosen filters were taken. The total exposure times at each wavelength were 42.7 hours (300 nm), 33.5 hours (450 nm), 30.3 hours (606 nm) and 34.3 hours (814 nm), divided into 342 individual exposures to prevent significant damage to individual images by cosmic rays, which cause bright streaks to appear when they strike CCD detectors. A further 10 Hubble orbits were used to make short exposures of flanking fields to aid follow-up observations by other instruments.

== Data processing ==
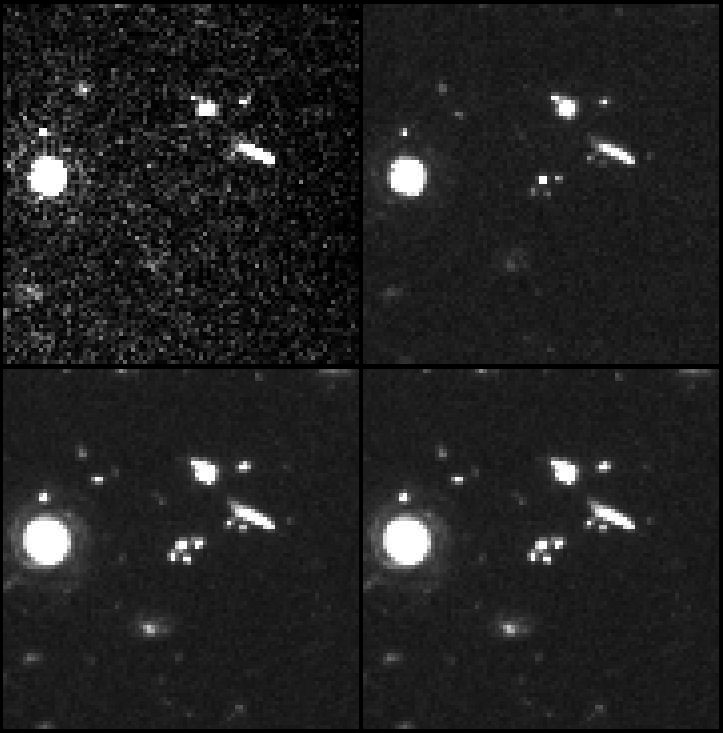
A section of the HDF about 14 arcseconds across in each of the four wavelengths used to construct the final version: 300 nm (top left), 450 nm (top right), 606 nm (bottom left) and 814 nm (bottom right)

The production of a final combined image at each wavelength was a complex process. Bright pixels caused by cosmic ray impacts during exposures were removed by comparing exposures of equal length taken one after the other, and identifying pixels that were affected by cosmic rays in one exposure but not the other. Trails of space debris and artificial satellites were present in the original images, and were carefully removed.

Scattered light from the Earth was evident in about a quarter of the data frames, creating a visible "X" pattern on the images. This was removed by taking an image affected by scattered light, aligning it with an unaffected image, and subtracting the unaffected image from the affected one. The resulting image was smoothed, and could then be subtracted from the bright frame. This procedure removed almost all of the scattered light from the affected images.

Once the 342 individual images were cleaned of cosmic-ray hits and corrected for scattered light, they had to be combined. Scientists involved in the HDF observations pioneered a technique called 'drizzling', in which the pointing of the telescope was varied minutely between sets of exposures. Each pixel on the WFPC2 CCD chips recorded an area of sky 0.09 arcseconds across, but by changing the direction in which the telescope was pointing by less than that between exposures, the resulting images were combined using sophisticated image-processing techniques to yield a final angular resolution better than this value. The HDF images produced at each wavelength had final pixel sizes of 0.03985 arcseconds.

The data processing yielded four monochrome images (at 300 nm, 450 nm, 606 nm and 814 nm), one at each wavelength. One image was designated as red (814 nm), the second as green (606 nm) and the third as blue (450 nm), and the three images were combined to give a color image. Because the wavelengths at which the images were taken do not correspond to the wavelengths of red, green and blue light, the colors in the final image only give an approximate representation of the actual colors of the galaxies in the image; the choice of filters for the HDF (and the majority of Hubble images) was primarily designed to maximize the scientific utility of the observations rather than to create colors corresponding to what the human eye would actually perceive.

== Contents ==
The final images were released at a meeting of the American Astronomical Society in January 1996, and revealed a plethora of distant, faint galaxies. About 3,000 distinct galaxies could be identified in the images, with both irregular and spiral galaxies clearly visible, although some galaxies in the field are only a few pixels across. In all, the HDF is thought to contain fewer than twenty galactic foreground stars; by far the majority of objects in the field are distant galaxies.

There are about fifty blue point-like objects in the HDF. Many seem to be associated with nearby galaxies, which together form chains and arcs: these are likely to be regions of intense star formation. Others may be distant quasars. Astronomers initially ruled out the possibility that some of the point-like objects are white dwarfs, because they are too blue to be consistent with theories of white dwarf evolution prevalent at the time. However, more recent work has found that many white dwarfs become bluer as they age, lending support to the idea that the HDF might contain white dwarfs.

== Scientific results ==
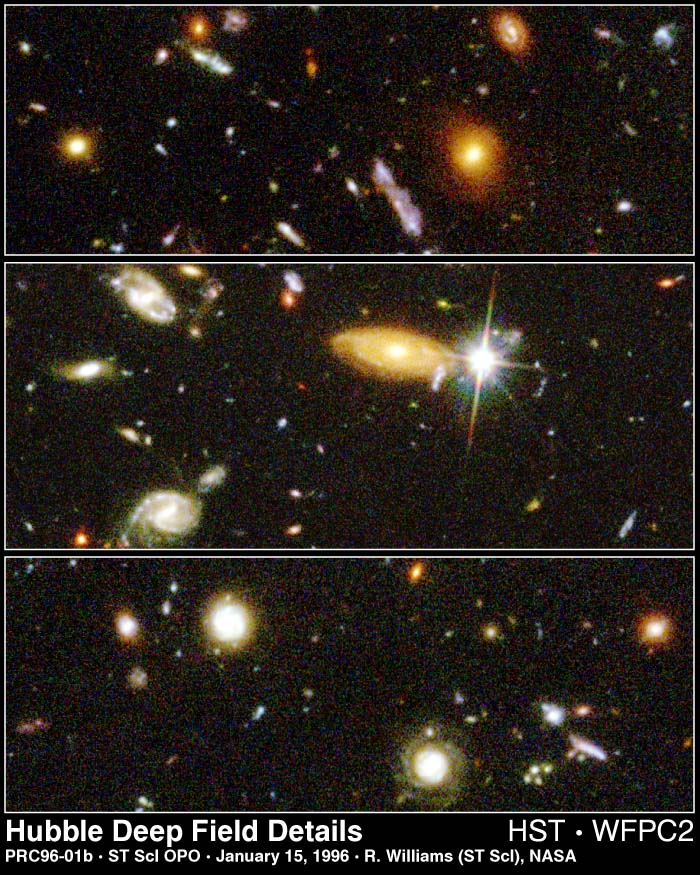
Details from the HDF illustrate the wide variety of galaxy shapes, sizes and colors found in the distant universe.

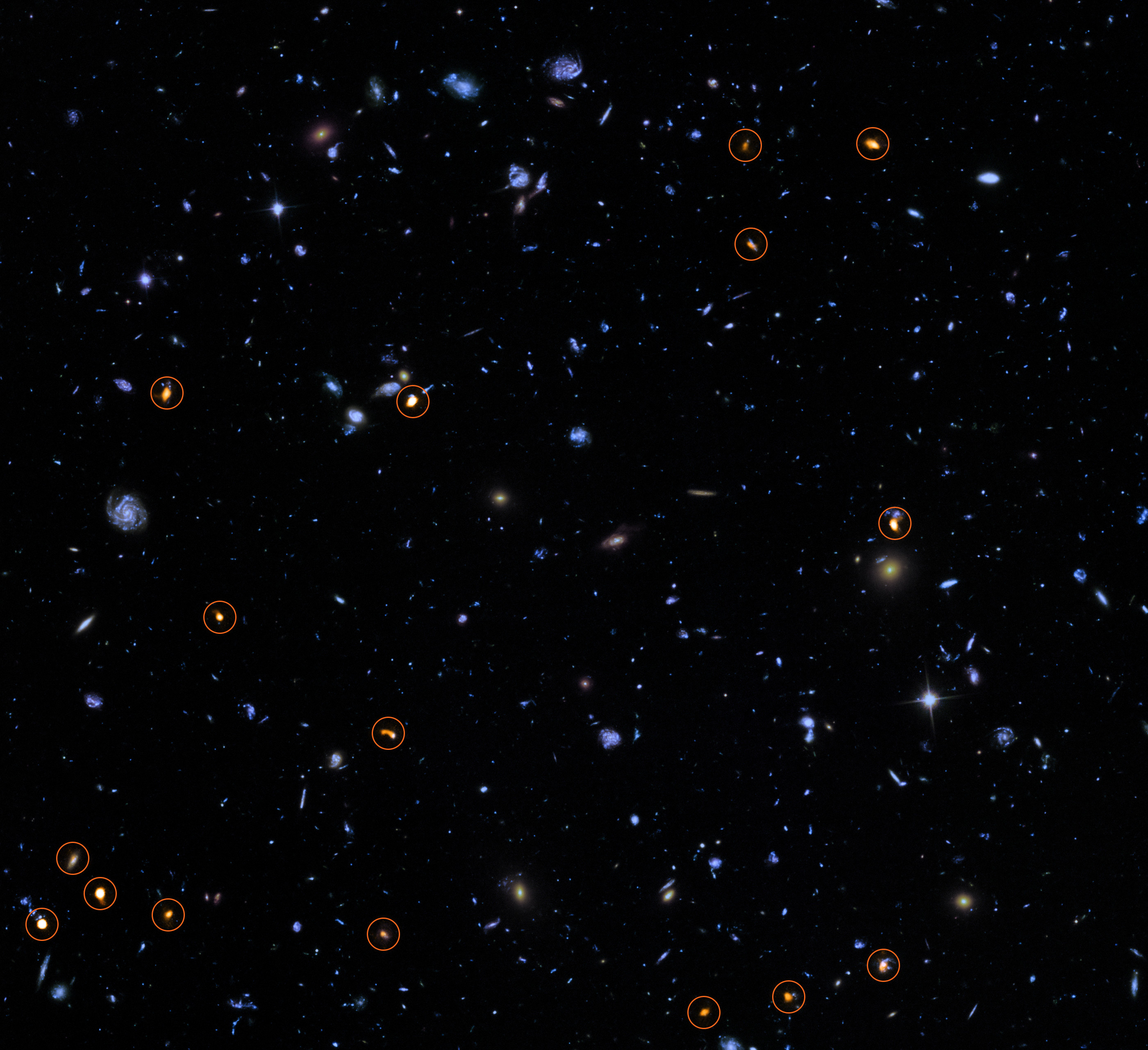
Deep field image taken by ALMA and Hubble.

The HDF data provided extremely rich material for cosmologists to analyse and by late 2014 the associated scientific paper for the image had received over 900 citations. One of the most fundamental findings was the discovery of large numbers of galaxies with high redshift values.

As the Universe expands, more distant objects recede from the Earth faster, in what is called the Hubble Flow. The light from very distant galaxies is significantly affected by the cosmological redshift. While quasars with high redshifts were known, very few galaxies with redshifts greater than one were known before the HDF images were produced. The HDF, however, contained many galaxies with redshifts as high as six, corresponding to distances of about 12 billion light-years. Due to redshift the most distant objects in the HDF (Lyman-break galaxies) are not actually visible in the Hubble images; they can only be detected in images of the HDF taken at longer wavelengths by ground-based telescopes. One of the first observations planned for the James Webb Space Telescope was a mid-infrared image of the Hubble Ultra-Deep Field.

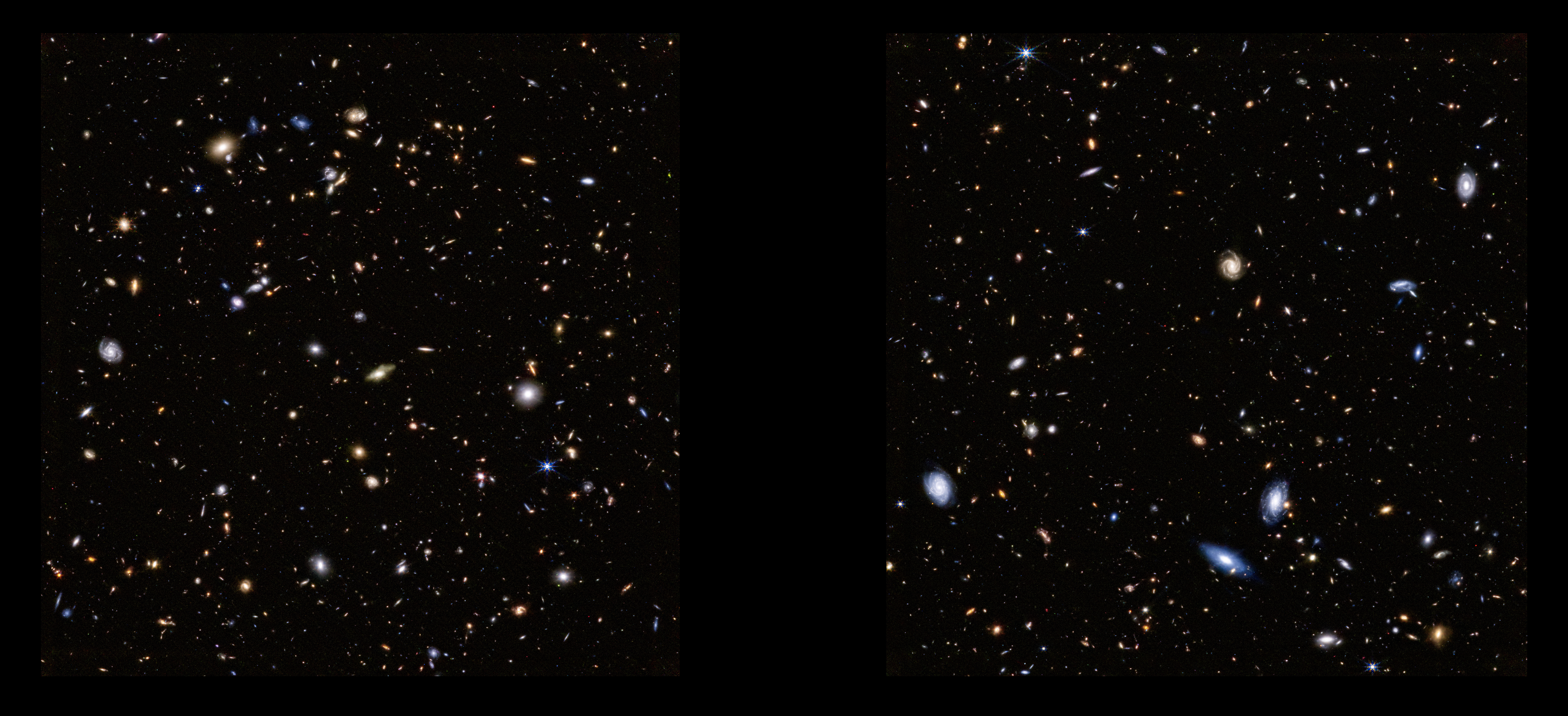
On 11 October 2022, the James Webb Space Telescope spent over 20 hours observing the long-studied Ultra Deep Field of the NASA/ESA Hubble Space Telescope for the first time.

The HDF galaxies contained a considerably larger proportion of disturbed and irregular galaxies than the local universe; galaxy collisions and mergers were more common in the young universe as it was much smaller than today. It is believed that giant elliptical galaxies form when spirals and irregular galaxies collide.

The wealth of galaxies at different stages of their evolution also allowed astronomers to estimate the variation in the rate of star formation over the lifetime of the Universe. While estimates of the redshifts of HDF galaxies are somewhat crude, astronomers believe that star formation was occurring at its maximum rate 8–10 billion years ago, and has decreased by a factor of about 10 since then.

Another important result from the HDF was the very small number of foreground stars present. For years astronomers had been puzzling over the nature of dark matter, mass which seems to be undetectable but which observations implied made up about 85% of all matter in the Universe by mass. One theory was that dark matter might consist of Massive Astrophysical Compact Halo Objects (MACHOs)—faint but massive objects such as red dwarfs and planets in the outer regions of galaxies. The HDF showed, however, that there were not significant numbers of red dwarfs in the outer parts of our galaxy.

== Multifrequency followup ==
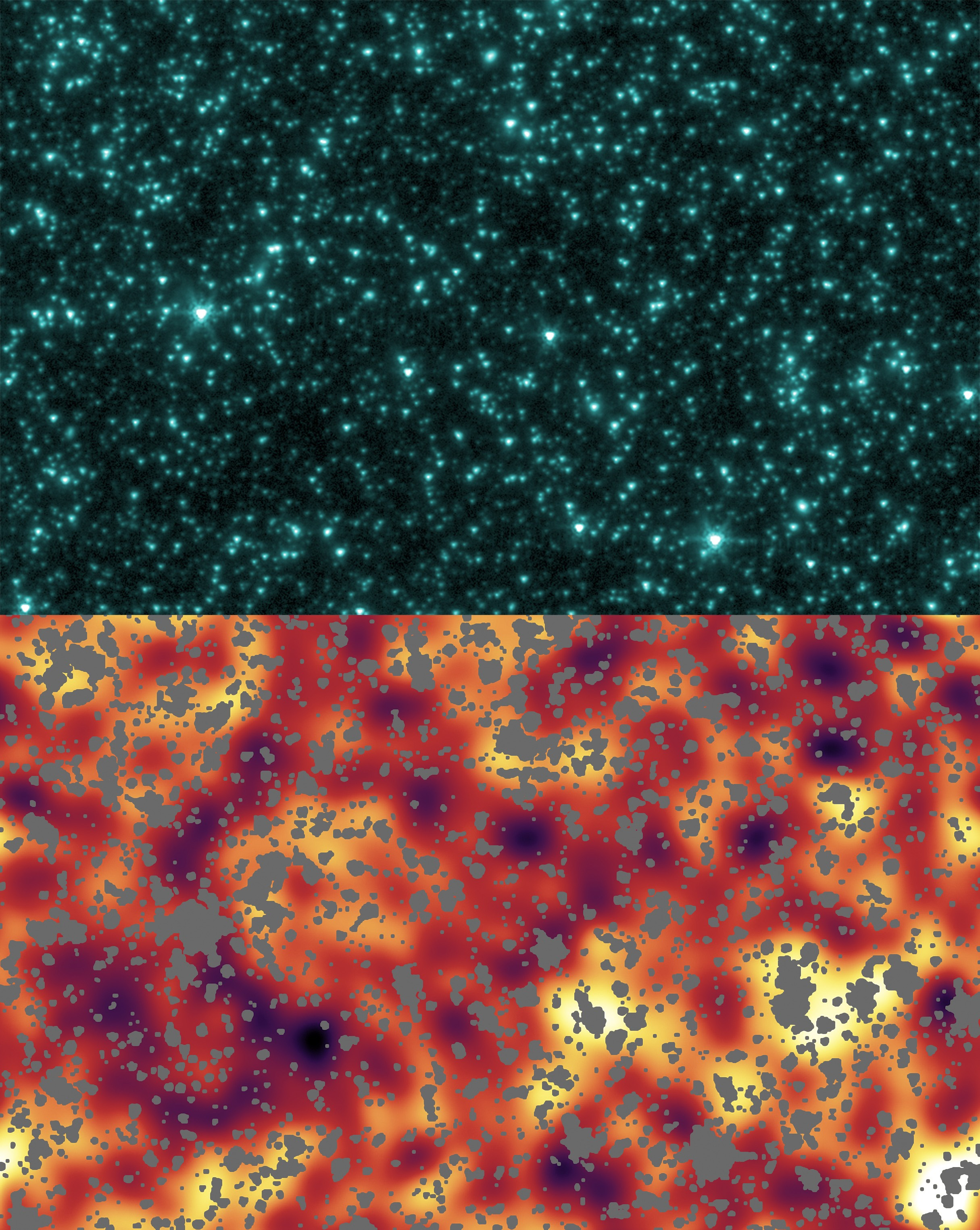
The HDF imaged by the Spitzer Space Telescope. The top segment shows the foreground objects in the field; the bottom shows the background with the foreground objects removed.

Very-high redshift objects (Lyman-break galaxies) cannot be seen in visible light and generally are detected in infrared or submillimetre wavelength surveys of the HDF instead. Observations with the Infrared Space Observatory (ISO) indicated infrared emission from 13 galaxies visible in the optical images, attributed to large quantities of dust associated with intense star formation. Infrared observations have also been made with the Spitzer Space Telescope. Submillimeter observations of the field have been made with SCUBA on the James Clerk Maxwell Telescope, initially detecting 5 sources, although with very low resolution. Observations have also been made with the Subaru telescope in Hawaii.

X-ray observations by the Chandra X-ray Observatory revealed six sources in the HDF, which were found to correspond to three elliptical galaxies, one spiral galaxy, one active galactic nucleus and one extremely red object, thought to be a distant galaxy containing a large amount of dust absorbing its blue light emissions.

Ground-based radio images taken using the VLA revealed seven radio sources in the HDF, all of which correspond to galaxies visible in the optical images. The field has also been surveyed with the Westerbork Synthesis Radio Telescope and the MERLIN array of radio telescopes at 1.4 GHz; the combination of VLA and MERLIN maps made at wavelengths of 3.5 and 20 cm have located 16 radio sources in the HDF-N field, with many more in the flanking fields. Radio images of some individual sources in the field have been made with the European VLBI Network at 1.6 GHz with a higher resolution than the Hubble maps.

== Subsequent HST observations ==
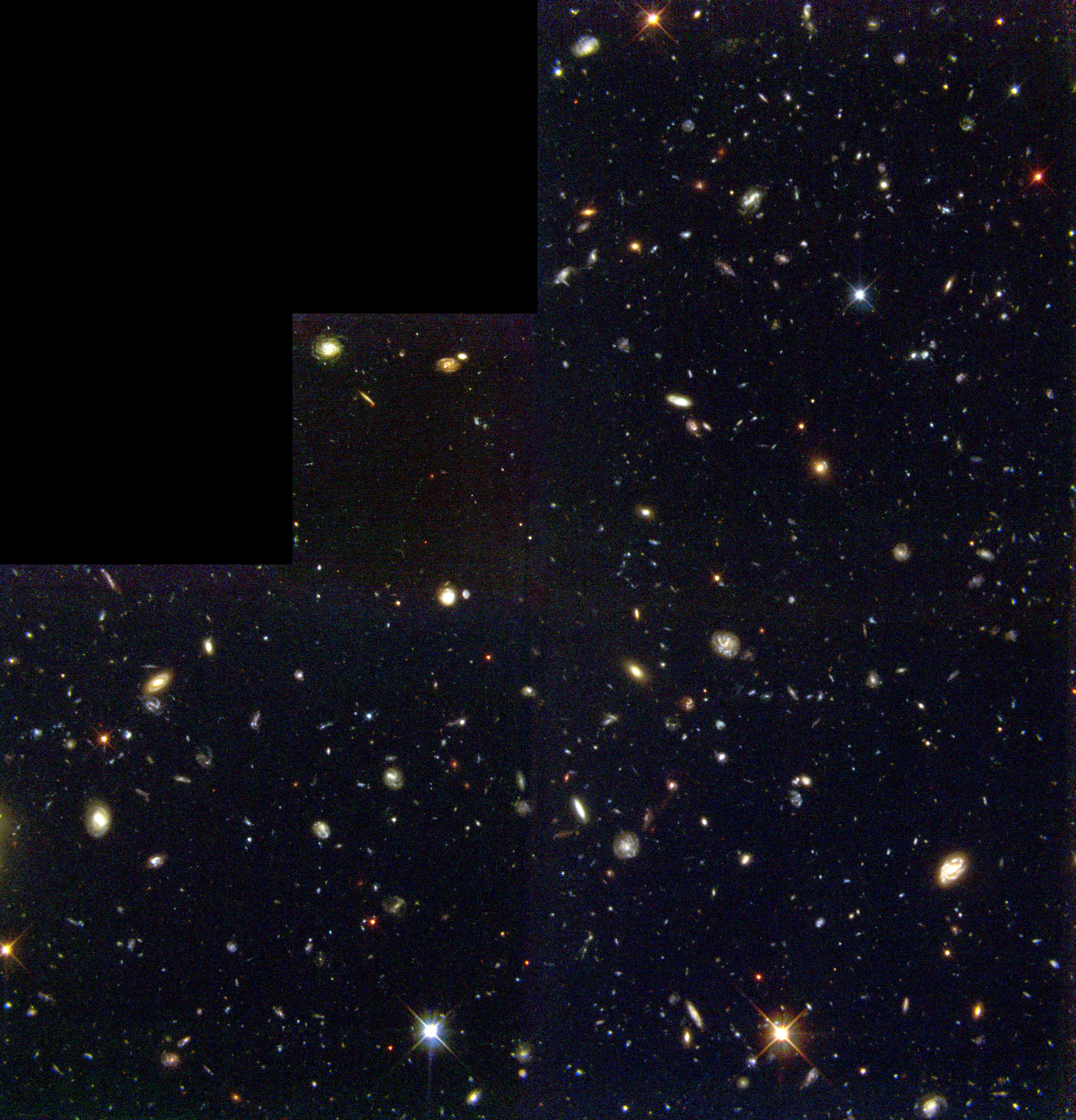
The Hubble Deep Field South looks very similar to the original HDF, demonstrating the cosmological principle.

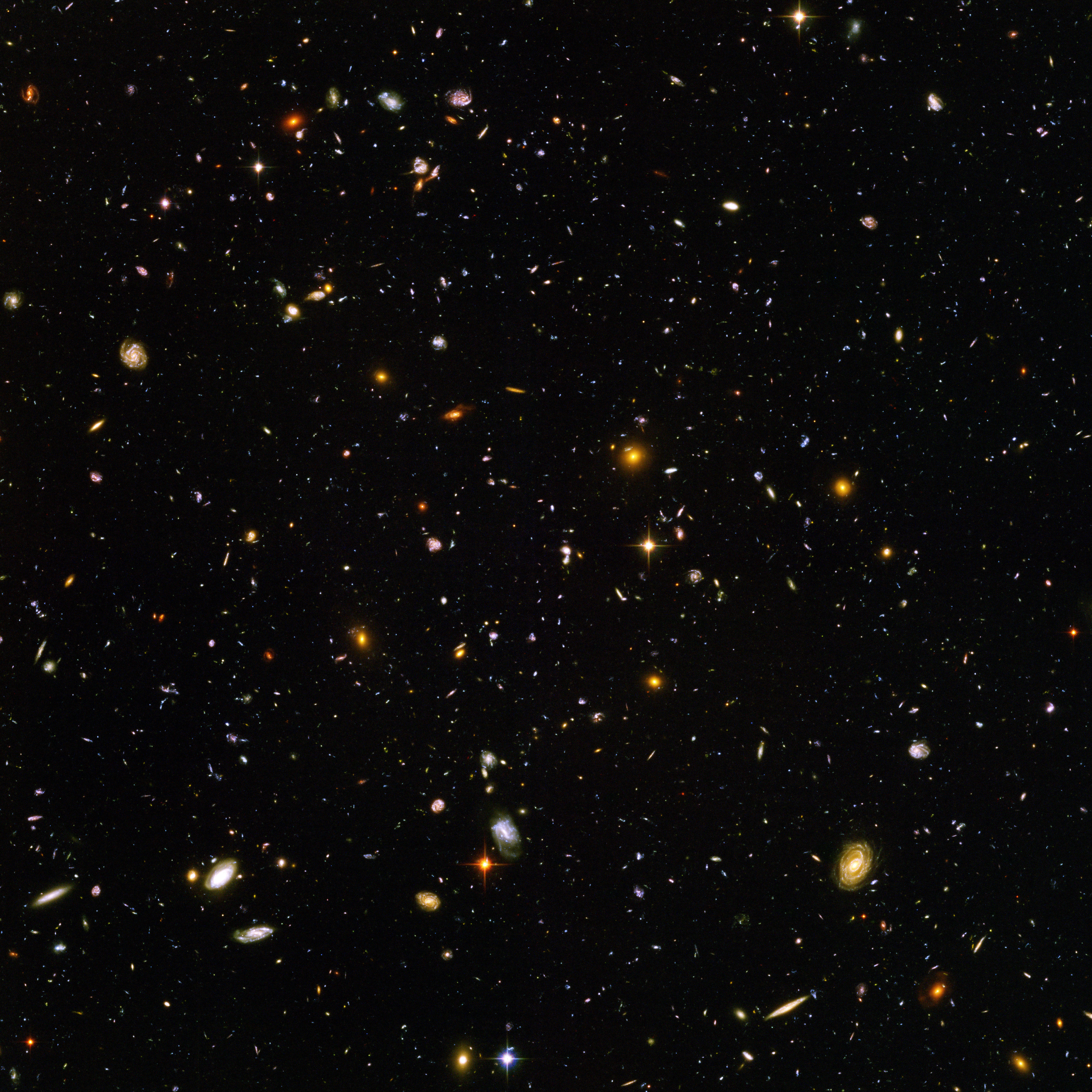
The Hubble Ultra-Deep Field further corroborates this.

An HDF counterpart in the southern celestial hemisphere was created in 1998: the HDF-South (HDF-S). Created using a similar observing strategy, the HDF-S was very similar in appearance to the original HDF. This supports the cosmological principle that at its largest scale the Universe is homogeneous. The HDF-S survey used the Space Telescope Imaging Spectrograph (STIS) and the Near Infrared Camera and Multi-Object Spectrometer (NICMOS) instruments installed on the HST in 1997; the region of the original Hubble Deep Field (HDF-N) has since been re-observed several times using WFPC2, as well as by the NICMOS and STIS instruments. Several supernova events were detected by comparing the first and second epoch observations of the HDF-N.

A wider survey, but less sensitive, was carried out as part of the Great Observatories Origins Deep Survey; a section of this was then observed for longer to create the Hubble Ultra-Deep Field, which was the most sensitive optical deep field image for years until the Hubble eXtreme Deep Field was completed in 2012. Images from the Extreme Deep Field, or XDF, were released on September 26, 2012, to a number of media agencies. Images released in the XDF show galaxies which are now believed to have formed in the first 500 million years following the Big Bang.

== See also ==
- List of deep fields

== Bibliography ==
- Abraham, R.G.; et al. (1996). "The Morphologies of Distant Galaxies. II. Classifications from the Hubble Space Telescope Medium Deep Survey" (PDF). Astrophysical Journal Supplement. 107: 1–17. Bibcode:1996ApJS..107....1A. doi:10.1086/192352. hdl:10183/109045.
- Alcock, C.; et al. (1992). A.V. Fillipenko (ed.). The search for massive compact halo objects with a (semi) robotic telescope. 103rd Annual Meeting of the Astronomical Society of the Pacific. Robotic telescopes in the 1990s. Vol. 34. pp. 193–202. Bibcode:1992ASPC...34..193A. ISBN 0-937707-53-8.
- Beckwith, S.V.; et al. (2006). "The Hubble Ultra Deep Field". The Astronomical Journal. 132 (5): 1729–1755. arXiv:astro-ph/0607632. Bibcode:2006AJ....132.1729B. doi:10.1086/507302. S2CID 119504137.
- Casertano, S.; et al. (2000). "WFPC2 Observations of the Hubble Deep Field South". The Astronomical Journal. 120 (6): 2747–2824. arXiv:astro-ph/0010245. Bibcode:2000AJ....120.2747C. doi:10.1086/316851. S2CID 119058107.
- Connolly, A.J.; et al. (1997). "The evolution of the global star formation history as measured from the Hubble Deep Field". Astrophysical Journal Letters. 486 (1): L11–L14. arXiv:astro-ph/9706255. Bibcode:1997ApJ...486L..11C. doi:10.1086/310829. S2CID 6869133.
- Ferguson, H.C. (2000a). N. Manset; C. Veillet; D. Crabtree (eds.). The Hubble Deep Fields. Astronomical Data Analysis Software and Systems IX. ASP Conference Proceedings. Vol. 216. Astronomical Society of the Pacific. pp. 395. ISBN 1-58381-047-1.
- Ferguson, H.C.; Dickinson, Mark; Williams, Robert (2000b). "The Hubble Deep Fields". Annual Review of Astronomy and Astrophysics. 38 (1): 667–715. arXiv:astro-ph/0004319. Bibcode:2000ARA&A..38..667F. doi:10.1146/annurev.astro.38.1.667. S2CID 20107441.
- Ferguson, A.S. (1998). The Hubble deep field. Reviews in Modern Astronomy. Vol. 11. pp. 83–115. Bibcode:1998RvMA...11...83F.
- Flynn, C.; Gould, A.; Bahcall, J. N. (1996). "Hubble Deep Field Constraint on Baryonic Dark Matter". Astrophysical Journal Letters. 466 (2): L55–L58. arXiv:astro-ph/9603035. Bibcode:1996ApJ...466L..55F. doi:10.1086/310174. S2CID 15891406.
- Schilizzi, M.A.; et al. (2000). "WSRT observations of the Hubble Deep Field region". Astronomy and Astrophysics. 361: L41–L44. arXiv:astro-ph/0008509. Bibcode:2000A&A...361L..41G.
- Garrett, M.A.; et al. (2001). "AGN and starbursts at high redshift: High resolution EVN radio observations of the Hubble Deep Field". Astronomy and Astrophysics. 366 (2): L5–L8. arXiv:astro-ph/0102037. Bibcode:2001A&A...366L...5G. doi:10.1051/0004-6361:20000537. S2CID 14344612.
- Hansen, B.M.S. (1998). J Paul; T Montmerle; E Aubourg (eds.). Observational signatures of old white dwarfs. 19th Texas Symposium on Relativistic Astrophysics. arXiv:astro-ph/9808273. Bibcode:1998astro.ph..8273H.; also published in Nature 394: 860 Bibcode:1998Natur.394..860H.
- Hornschemeier, A.E.; et al. (2000). "X-Ray sources in the Hubble Deep Field detected by Chandra". The Astrophysical Journal. 541 (1): 49–53. arXiv:astro-ph/0004260. Bibcode:2000ApJ...541...49H. doi:10.1086/309431. S2CID 119409090.
- Richards, E.A.; et al. (1998). "Radio Emission from Galaxies in the Hubble Deep Field". The Astronomical Journal. 116 (3): 1039–1054. arXiv:astro-ph/9803343. Bibcode:1998AJ....116.1039R. doi:10.1086/300489. S2CID 15644905.
- Gonzalez-Serrano, M.; et al. (1997). "Observations of the Hubble Deep Field with the Infrared Space Observatory – V. Spectral energy distributions, starburst models and star formation history". Monthly Notices of the Royal Astronomical Society. 289 (2): 490–496. arXiv:astro-ph/9707030. Bibcode:1997MNRAS.289..490R. doi:10.1093/mnras/289.2.490.
- Trauger, J.T.; et al. (1994). "The on-orbit performance of WFPC2" (PDF). Astrophysical Journal Letters. 435 (1): L3–L6. Bibcode:1994ApJ...435L...3T. doi:10.1086/187580. Archived (PDF) from the original on 2021-11-22.
- Trimble, V. (1987). "Existence and nature of dark matter in the universe" (PDF). Annual Review of Astronomy and Astrophysics. 25 (1): 425–472. Bibcode:1987ARA&A..25..425T. doi:10.1146/annurev.aa.25.090187.002233. S2CID 123199266.
- Williams, R.E.; et al. (1996). "The Hubble Deep Field: Observations, Data Reduction, and Galaxy Photometry". The Astronomical Journal. 112: 1335–1389. arXiv:astro-ph/9607174. Bibcode:1996AJ....112.1335W. doi:10.1086/118105. S2CID 17310815.
- Williams, R.E.; et al. (2000). "The Hubble Deep Field South: Formulation of the Observing Campaign". The Astronomical Journal. 120 (6): 2735–2746. Bibcode:2000AJ....120.2735W. doi:10.1086/316854.
