= PG 1011−040 =

Seyfert 1 galaxy in Sextans

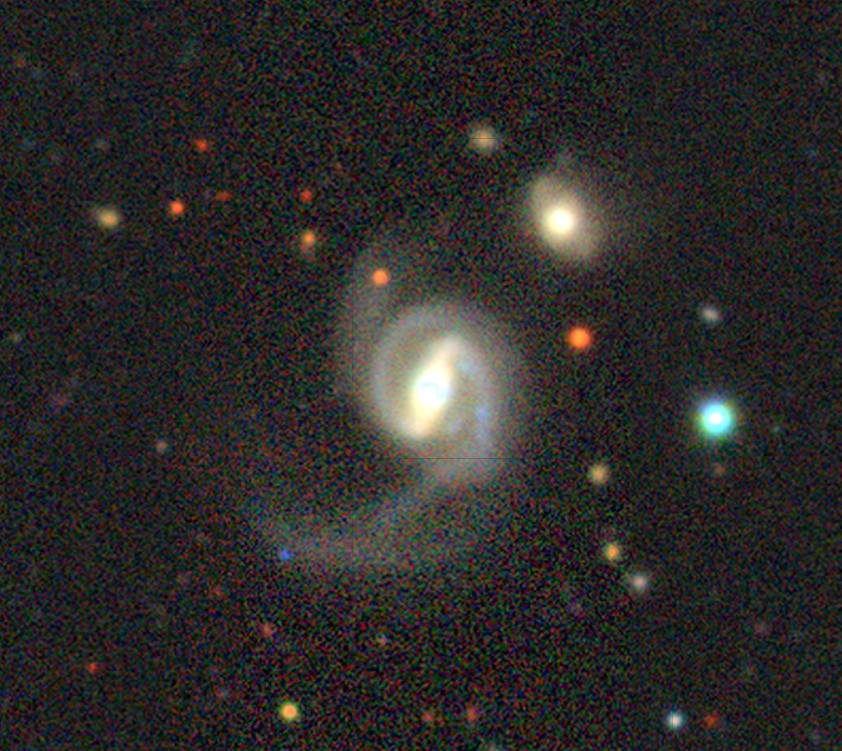
- PG 1011−040 as imaged by Legacy Surveys

Observation data (J2000 epoch)
- Constellation: Sextans
- Right ascension: 10^{h} 14^{m} 20.67^{s}
- Declination: −04° 18′ 40.26″
- Redshift: 0.058314
- Heliocentric radial velocity: 17,482 km/s ± 45
- Distance: 822 Mly
- Apparent magnitude (V): 15.5
- Apparent magnitude (B): 15.49

Characteristics
- Type: SB(r)b: pec Sy1
- Size: ~223,200 ly (68.42 kpc) (estimated)

Other designations
- 6dF J1014207−041841, HE 1011−0403, PGC 29863, 1AXG J101420−0418

PG 1011−040 is a Seyfert type 1 galaxy and a radio-quiet quasar located in the constellation of Sextans. The redshift of the galaxy is (z) 0.058 and it was first discovered by astronomers in June 1983 who were conducting the Palomar Quasar Survey (PG).

== Description ==
PG 1011−040 is categorized as a narrow-line Seyfert galaxy with weak X-ray source and a total luminosity of 6.3 × 10^{41} erg s^{−1}. Its host is classified to be a barred spiral galaxy of type SBb with a disk appearance, peculiar inner ring structures and presence of spiral arms. The supermassive black hole mass of the galaxy is estimated to be 7.43 M_{☉} and the total star formation rate of the galaxy is 4.82 M_{☉} per year. The stellar mass of the galaxy is estimated to be 10.31 M_{☉}.

The radio source is found compact. When imaged with Very Large Array (VLA), it appears to show a marginal elongation towards the direction of northwest with a presence of a radio core containing a flat radio spectrum. There are also weak extensions shown, hinting either radio emission from the lobes or even a jet on sub-arcsecond scales. A slightly extended structure is found based on radio imaging made by VLA with the total flux density of 0.38 mJy. There is also a bit of extended bipolar emission in mainly the southwest and northeast sides made by hinting the active galactic nucleus of PG 1011−040 is responsible for the emission production.

A study published in 2021, found PG 1011−040 has presence of molecular gas. When observed, its carbon monoxide morphology is split into a simple bulge component which in turn, is surrounded by a clumpy structure that is ring-like in appearance. A study in August 2022, has found five star-forming regions mainly located within its ring structure with a stellar bar feature shown penetrating through its nuclear region from the ring structure.
