= Extragalactic background light =

Accumulated radiation in the universe

The diffuse extragalactic background light (EBL) is all the accumulated radiation in the universe due to star formation processes, plus a contribution from active galactic nuclei (AGNs). This radiation covers almost all wavelengths of the electromagnetic spectrum, except the microwave, which is dominated by the primordial cosmic microwave background. The EBL is part of the diffuse extragalactic background radiation (DEBRA), which by definition covers the entire electromagnetic spectrum. After the cosmic microwave background, the EBL produces the second-most energetic diffuse background, thus being essential for understanding the full energy balance of the universe.

The understanding of the EBL is also fundamental for extragalactic very-high-energy (VHE, 30 GeV-30 TeV) astronomy. VHE photons coming from cosmological distances are attenuated by pair production with EBL photons. This interaction is dependent on the spectral energy distribution (SED) of the EBL. Therefore, it is necessary to know the SED of the EBL in order to study intrinsic properties of the emission in the VHE sources.

== Observations ==
The direct measurement of the EBL is difficult mainly due to the contribution of zodiacal light that is orders of magnitude higher than the EBL. Different groups have claimed the detection of the EBL in the optical and near-infrared. However, it has been proposed that these analyses have been contaminated by zodiacal light. Recently, two independent groups using different technique have claimed the detection of the EBL in the optical with no contamination from zodiacal light.

There are also other techniques that set limits to the background. It is possible to set lower limits from deep galaxy surveys. On the other hand, VHE observations of extragalactic sources set upper limits to the EBL.

In November 2018, astronomers reported that the EBL amounted to 4 × 10^{84} photons.

== Empirical modelings ==
There are empirical approaches that predict the overall SED of the EBL in the local universe as well as its evolution over time. These types of modeling can be divided in four different categories according to:

(i) Forward evolution, which begins with cosmological initial conditions and follows a forward evolution with time by means of semi-analytical models of galaxy formation.

(ii) Backward evolution, which begins with existing galaxy populations and extrapolates them backwards in time.

(iii) Evolution of the galaxy populations that is inferred over a range of redshifts. The galaxy evolution is inferred here using some quantity derived from observations such as the star formation rate density of the universe.

(iv) Evolution of the galaxy populations that is directly observed over the range of redshifts that contribute significantly to the EBL.

== See also ==
- Cosmic infrared background
- Cosmic microwave background (CMB) radiation
- Diffuse extragalactic background radiation
