= X-ray source =

X-ray sources abound around us. They include the following:

- Natural X-ray sources:
  - Astrophysical X-ray source, as viewed in X-ray astronomy
  - X-ray background
  - Naturally occurring radionuclides
- Artificial X-ray sources
  - Radiopharmaceuticals in radiopharmacology
    - Radioactive tracer
    - Brachytherapy
  - X-ray tube, a vacuum tube that produces X-rays when current flows through it
  - X-ray laser
  - X-ray generator, any of various devices using X-ray tubes, lasers, or radioisotopes
  - Synchrotron, which produces X-rays as synchrotron radiation
  - Cyclotron, which produces X-rays as cyclotron radiation
