= HE 0437−5439 =

Hypervelocity star in the constellation Dorado

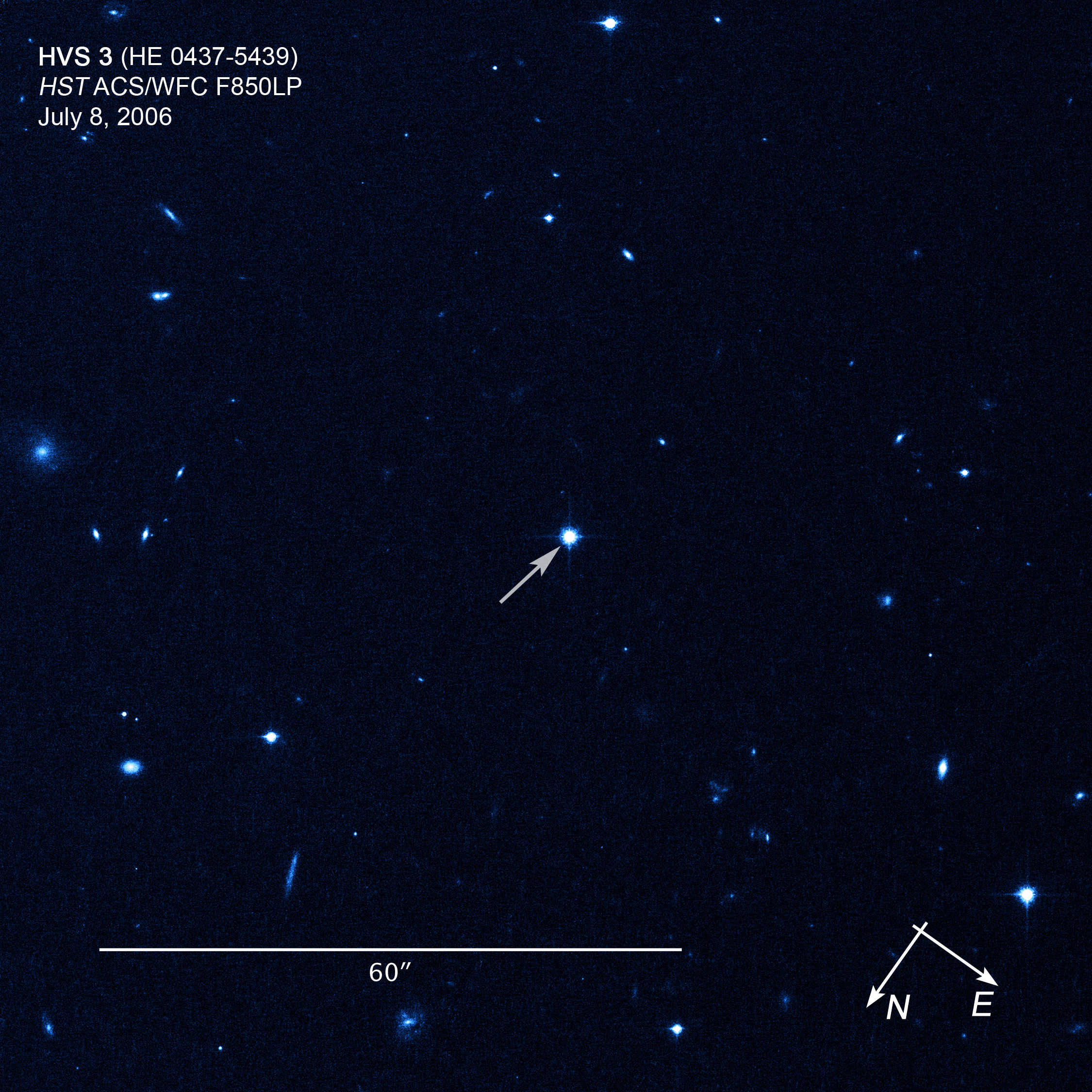

Observation data Epoch J2000.0 Equinox ICRS
- Constellation: Dorado
- Right ascension: 04^{h} 38^{m} 12.772^{s}
- Declination: −54° 33′ 11.86″
- Apparent magnitude (V): 16.42

Characteristics
- Spectral type: BV or sdB+F

Astrometry
Distance	200,000 ly

Details
Mass	8 M_{☉}
Age	25 Myr

Other designations
- GSC2 S01132011256, HE 0437−5439, [BGK2006] HV 3, HVS3

Database references
SIMBAD	data

HE 0437−5439 is a massive, unbound hypervelocity star (HVS), also called HVS3. It is a main sequence B-type star located in the constellation Dorado. It was discovered in 2005 with the Kueyen 8.2-metre (320 in) telescope, which is part of the European Southern Observatory's Very Large Telescope array. HE 0437−5439 is a young star, with an age of around 30 million years. The mass of the star is almost nine times greater than the mass of the Sun and the star is located 200,000 light years away in the direction of the Dorado constellation, 16 degrees northwest of the Large Magellanic Cloud (LMC) and farther away than the LMC. The star appears to be receding at an extremely high velocity of 723 kilometres per second (449 mi/s), or 2,600,000 kilometres per hour (1,600,000 mph). At this speed, the star is no longer gravitationally bound and will leave the Milky Way galaxy system and escape into intergalactic space. It was thought to have originated in the LMC and been ejected from it soon after birth. This could happen if it originally was one of a pair of stars and if there is a supermassive black hole in the LMC.

In 2010 a study was published in which its proper motion was estimated using images from the Hubble Space Telescope from 2006 and 2009. This ruled out the possibility that the star came from the Large Magellanic Cloud, but was consistent with the hypothesis that it was ejected from the center of the Milky Way. Given its velocity, this would have occurred 100 million years ago. However, the star seems to be at most 20 million years old, which implies that it is a blue straggler, a star born from the merger of a binary star system, which was earlier ejected from the center of the Milky Way. In order for this to happen, there must have originally been a three-star system, or else there were two black holes and just the two stars.

== Mechanism of ejection from the Milky Way ==
Studies say that a triple-star system was traveling through the center of the Milky Way when it came too close to the Galactic Center (which is thought to have a giant black hole). One of the stars was captured by the black hole causing the other two to be ejected from the Milky Way, where they merged to form a hot blue star. The star is moving at a speed of 1,600,000 miles per hour (2,600,000 km/h), about three times faster than the Sun's orbital velocity around the galaxy's center, and also faster than the galaxy's escape velocity.

The star is about 200,000 light years from the galaxy's center. Some doubt has surrounded the previous studies based on the speed and position of HE 0437−5439. The star would have to be at least 100 million years old to have traveled that distance from the galactic core, yet its mass and blue color indicate that it had burned only for 20 million years. These observations led to the explanation that it was part of a triple-star system consisting of two closely bound stars and one outer star. The black hole pulled the outer star away, which granted the star's momentum to the tight binary system and boosted both stars to escape velocity from the galaxy. As the stars traveled away, they went into normal stellar evolution, with one of them becoming a red giant and engulfing the other and forming one giant star — a blue straggler.

In 2008, a team of astronomers found a match between the star's chemical composition and the characteristics of stars in the Large Magellanic Cloud. Support that the star originated in the LMC was strengthened because the star is only 65,000 light years away from the nearby galaxy. Later observations using the Hubble Space Telescope showed that the star originated from the Milky Way's galactic center.

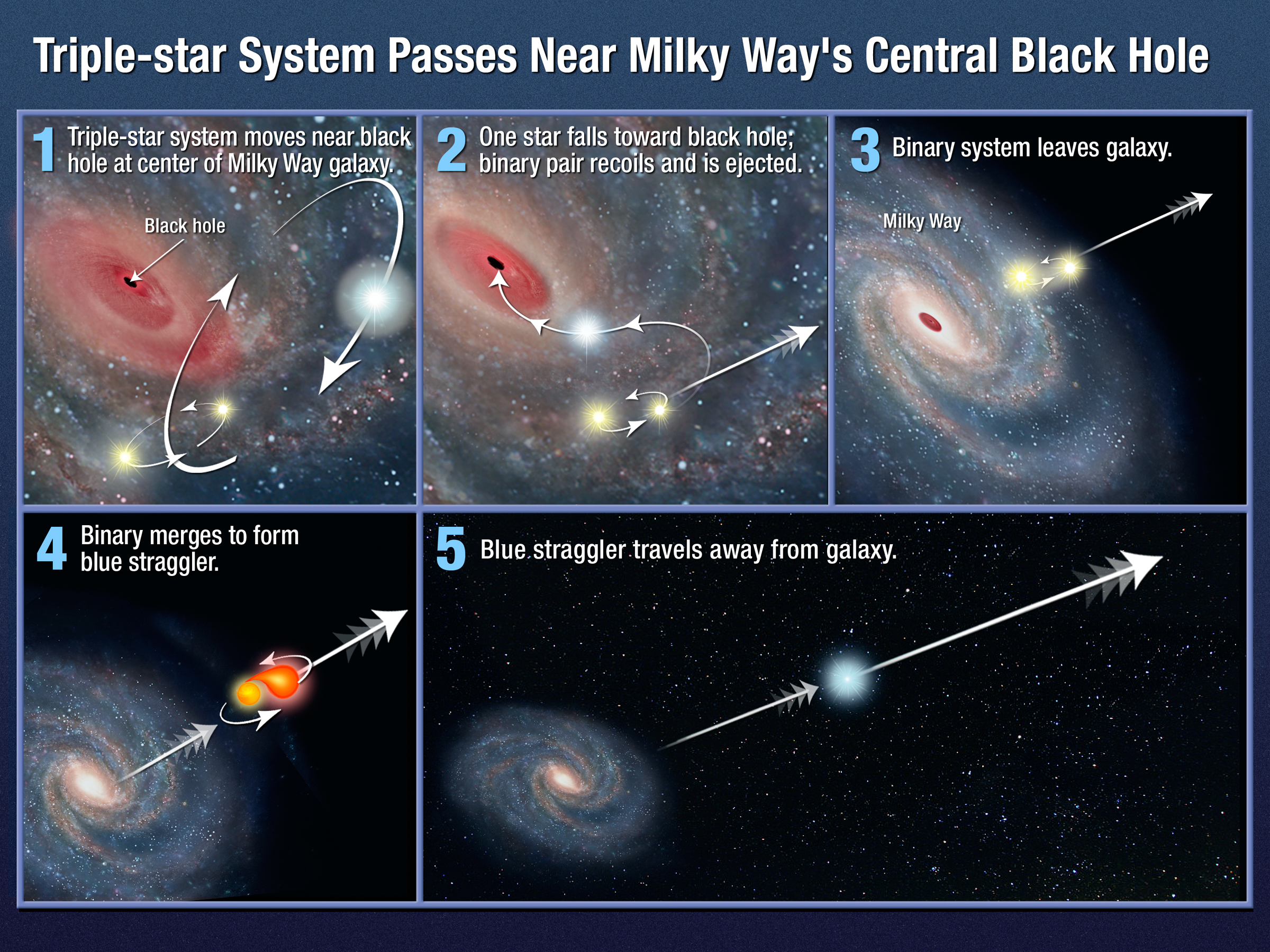
Illustration of the proposed mechanism of ejection.

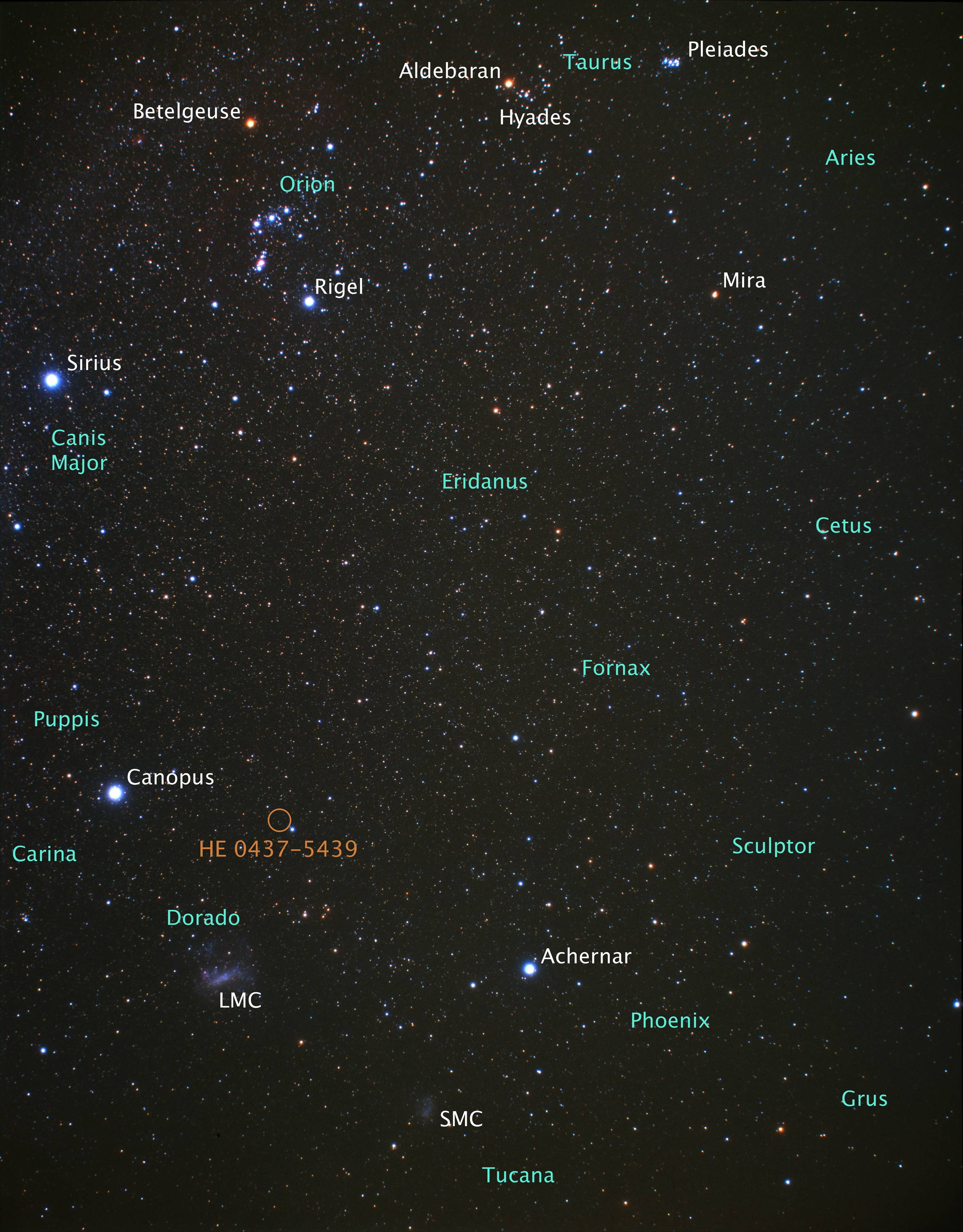
Exact position of the star.

== See also ==
- Intergalactic star
- Stellar kinematics
- Blue straggler
