= ISOHDFS 27 =

Galaxy in the constellation Tucana

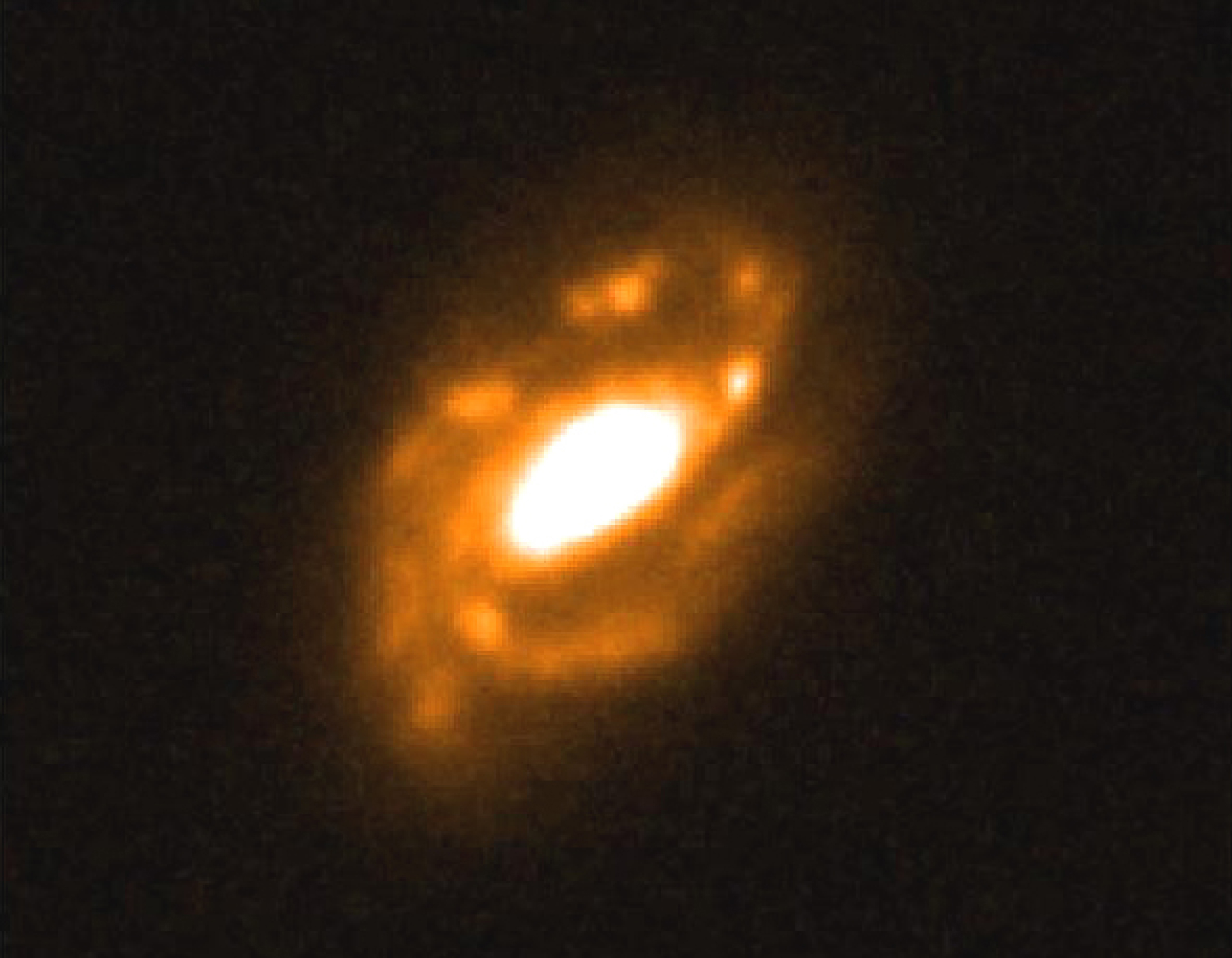
- ISOHDFS 27 taken by the Hubble Space Telescope

Observation data (J2000 epoch)
- Constellation: Tucana
- Right ascension: 22^{h} 32^{m} 47.6^{s}
- Declination: −60° 33′ 36″
- Redshift: 0.5807±0.0003
- Heliocentric radial velocity: 174,090±90 km/s
- Galactocentric velocity: 174,009±90 km/s
- Distance: 7.776 ± 0.5444 Gly (2,384.1 ± 166.9 Mpc)h^{−1}_{0.6774} (Comoving); 5.414 Gly (1.660 Gpc)h^{−1}_{0.6774} (Light-travel)
- Apparent magnitude (V): 20.51

Characteristics
- Type: Sbc
- Mass: 1.04×10^{12} M_{☉}
- Size: 130,000 ly (40 kpc)
- Apparent size (V): 7″

Other designations
- HDFS J223247.66-603335.9, LFR2003 193, SB-WF 3572-1508, CDD2000 1670, USNOA2 0225-31548819

ISOHDFS 27 is a spiral galaxy in the constellation Tucana located approximately 2,384.1 megaparsecs (7.776 billion light-years) from Earth. Discovered in the Hubble Deep Field South survey, it is the most massive spiral galaxy found in the survey, measuring at a total mass of 1.04 trillion times the mass of the Sun (M_{☉}) within 40 kiloparsecs (100,000 light-years), making it about four times as massive as the Milky Way. In addition, the baryonic mass has been calculated to be half of the dynamical mass, about 600 billion M_{☉}. Although it was once described as the most massive known spiral galaxy, larger possible mass estimates have been suggested for other spiral galaxies such as UGC 2885, Andromeda Galaxy, and as well as Milky Way.

Although ISOHDFS 27 does not have any known measured isophotal diameter, an angular diameter of about 7 arcseconds has been suggested, corresponding to a diameter of 40 kiloparsecs (130,000 light-years) in diameter, nearly as large as the Andromeda Galaxy.

== See also ==
- List of galaxies
- NGC 6872 – The largest known spiral galaxy by diameter
