= Diffuse extragalactic background radiation =

Photon field that fills our universe

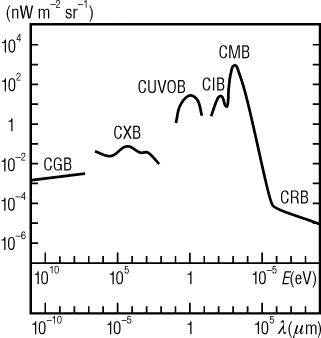
Schematic representation of the spectral energy distribution of the DEBRA. The dependent quantity is the spectral radiance multiplied by wavelength, i.e. λL_{eλ}. Legend: gamma-ray background (CGB), cosmic X-ray background (CXB), cosmic ultraviolet/optical background (CUVOB), cosmic infrared background (CIB), cosmic microwave background (CMB), and cosmic radio background (CRB)

The diffuse extragalactic background radiation (DEBRA) refers to the photon field of extragalactic origin that fills our Universe. It contains photons whose energies span more than twenty orders of magnitude, from 10^{−7} eV to more than 100 GeV. This range covers everything from the microwaves emitted by free hydrogen atoms to ultra high-energy gamma rays, which can only be emitted by the most powerful physical processes in the modern universe such as kilonovas and merging black holes.

The origin and the physical processes involved are different within every wavelength range. There is plenty of observational evidence that support the existence of the DEBRA. The figure shows a schematic picture, based on many different data sets, of the spectral intensity (also called spectral radiance) multiplied by wavelength of the DEBRA over all the electromagnetic spectrum. This representation is convenient because the area inside the curve is the energy. The nature and history of the universe is coded in this radiation field and any realistic cosmological model must be able to describe it. Understanding the DEBRA is a major challenge of modern cosmology with huge consequences in other fields of astrophysics, therefore extraordinary efforts are being put by theoreticians, observers, and instrumentalists to do so.

== Regions of the DEBRA ==
The overall diffuse extragalactic radiation field may be divided in different regions according to their origin and physical processes involved. This is a standard classification from the highest down to the lowest energies:

- Diffuse extragalactic gamma-ray radiation (also known as cosmic gamma-ray background)
- Cosmic X-ray background
- Extragalactic background light (which includes the cosmic infrared background)
- Cosmic microwave background
- Cosmic radio background

== See also ==
- Photon underproduction crisis
