= Kelly Holley-Bockelmann =

American astrophysicist

- Education: Montana State University (BS); University of Michigan (MS, PhD)
- Scientific career
- Fields: Astrophysics, Cosmology, Gravitational-wave astronomy, Multi-messenger astronomy
- Workplaces: Vanderbilt University; Fisk University
- Thesis: Galactic mergers and the persistence of the core Fundamental Plane (1999)
- Doctoral advisor: Douglas Richstone
- Website: https://kellyholleybockelmann.squarespace.com/

J. Kelly Holley-Bockelmann is an American astrophysicist who held the position of Stevenson Professor of Physics at Vanderbilt University and was the chair of NASA's Laser Interferometer Space Antenna Study Team and the chair of NASA's Astrophysics Advisory Committee. She now works at the Netherlands Institute for Space Research in Leiden, Netherlands. Holley-Bockelmann is also known for her efforts to increase diversity in STEM education, particularly for her work as the director of the Fisk-Vanderbilt Bridge Program.

== Early life and education ==
Holley-Bockelmann became interested in astronomy during her childhood in Montana, where she spent evenings lying on the ground and looking up at the Milky Way. She has said she wanted to be an astronomer before she knew what an astronomer was.

Holley-Bockelmann obtained her undergraduate degree in physics from Montana State University in 1993. She completed her master's degree at the University of Michigan and obtained her PhD in astronomy from the University of Michigan in 1999.

== Research and career ==
After earning her doctorate, Holley-Bockelmann held positions as a postdoctoral fellow at Case Western Reserve University, the University of Massachusetts Amherst, and the Center of Gravitational Wave Physics at Pennsylvania State University. Her research during this time focused heavily on simulations of galaxies, black holes, and gravitational-wave science.

Following her fellowships, Holley-Bockelmann was appointed a faculty member at Vanderbilt University in 2007. In 2023, she led the founding of the Establishing Multimessenger Astronomy Inclusive Training (EMIT) program at Vanderbilt University, which was the United States' first graduate certificate program in multi-messenger astronomy.

In 2017, Holley-Bockelmann was appointed the chair of NASA's study team for the Laser Interferometer Space Antenna (LISA), a joint mission between NASA and the European Space Agency. In October 2022, she was appointed the chair of NASA's Astrophysics Advisory Committee.

=== Advocacy ===
Being a first-generation college student and woman in STEM has driven Holley-Bockelmann to further efforts to improve gender and race diversity in the hard sciences. Holley-Bockelmann has been recognized by the American Association for the Advancement of Science (AAAS) for her work to create a "more vibrant and inclusive scientific community," particularly in the fields of physics and astronomy.

In the field of astronomy, she is one of the principal investigators of the Sloan Digital Sky Survey's Faculty and Student Teams (FAST) program, designed to remove the roadblocks that prevent students from entering astronomy and other sciences.

She has been a faculty member and mentor for the Fisk-Vanderbilt Bridge Program since 2007 and became co-director of the program in 2015. In 2022, she received the AAAS Mentor Award for her work with the Bridge Program. Holley-Bockelmann also focused on inclusion when developing the EMIT program, which is specifically designed to foster diversity and inclusion in multi-messenger astronomy.

In 2026, Holley-Bockelmann left her position at Vanderbilt due to difficulties working in the scientific environment created by President Trump's administration. She now works at SRON, the Dutch national institute for space research in Leiden.

=== Public engagement ===
In 2016, Holley-Bockelmann was part of the effort to share the news of the first observation of gravitational waves with the public, presenting at TEDxNashville in May of that year.

As a member of the LISA project, Holley-Bockelmann was part of NASA's black hole week in April 2021, using the question of what black holes' collective name should be to share LISA's capability to detect primordial black holes.
