= Infrared Space Observatory =

Orbital satellite telescope

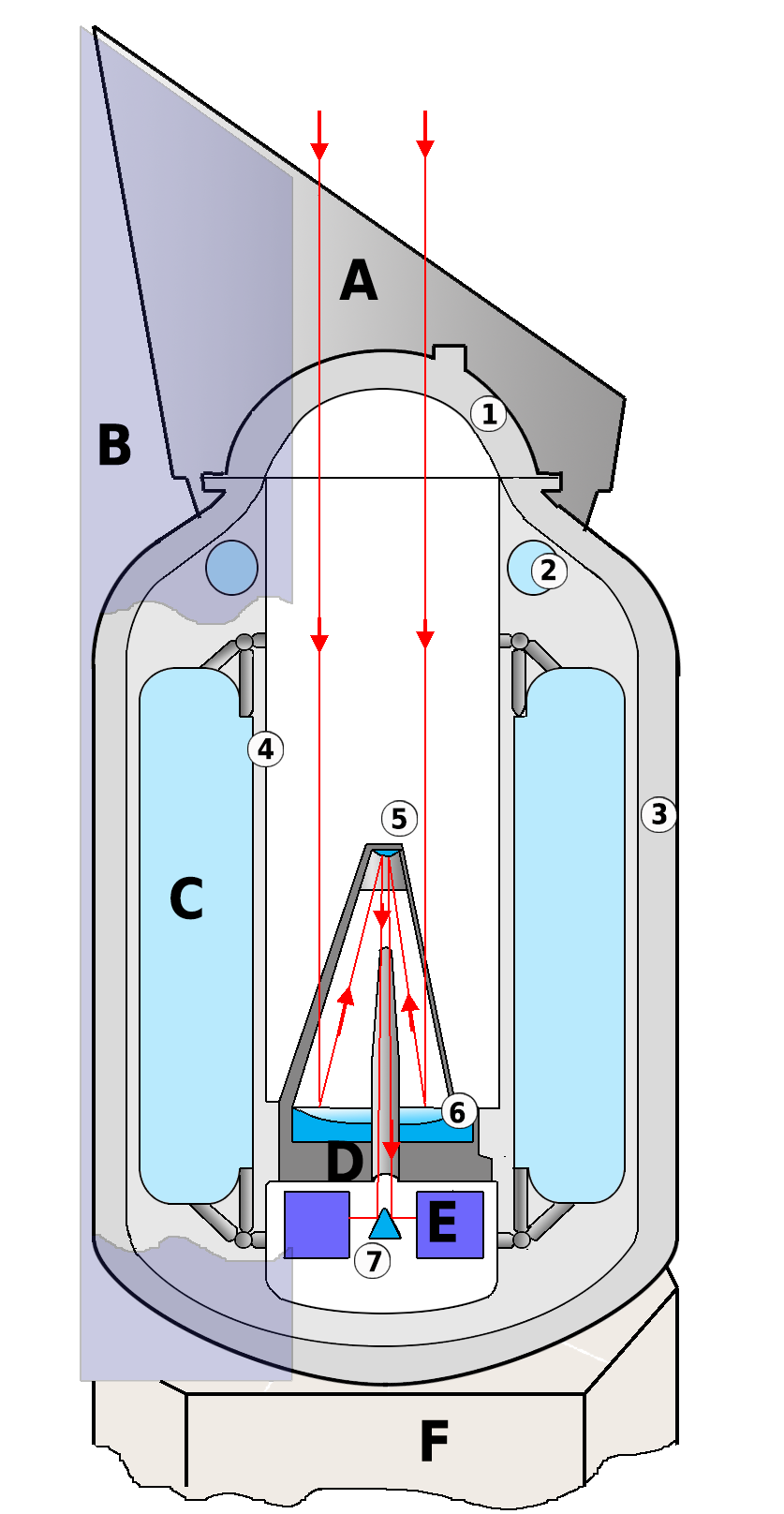
- Scheme of the telescope
- Names: ISO
- Operator: ESA with significant contributions from ISAS and NASA
- COSPAR ID: 1995-062A
- SATCAT no.: 23715
- Website: ISO at ESA science
- Mission duration: 28 months 22 days

Spacecraft properties
- Manufacturer: Aérospatiale
- BOL mass: 2498 kg

Start of mission
- Launch date: 01:20, 17 November 1995 (UTC)
- Rocket: Ariane 4 4P
- Launch site: ELA-2

End of mission
- Deactivated: 16 May 1998 12:00 UTC

Orbital parameters
- Reference system: Geocentric
- Regime: Highly elliptical
- Perigee altitude: 1000 km
- Apogee altitude: 70600 km
- Period: 24 hr

Orbiter

Main telescope
- Type: Ritchey-Chrétien
- Diameter: 60 cm
- Focal length: 900 cm, f/15
- Wavelengths: 2.4 to 240 micrometre (infrared)
Instruments
- ISOCAM: ISO Infrared Camera
- ISOPHOT: ISO photo-polarimeter
- LWS: Long Wave Spectrometer
- SWS: Short Wave Spectrometer
- Legacy ESA insignia (2020s)

The Infrared Space Observatory (ISO) was a space telescope for infrared light designed and operated by the European Space Agency (ESA), in cooperation with ISAS (now part of JAXA) and NASA. The ISO was designed to study infrared light at wavelengths of 2.5 to 240 micrometres and operated from 1995 to 1998.

The €480.1-million satellite was launched on 17 November 1995 from the ELA-2 launch pad at the Guiana Space Centre near Kourou in French Guiana. The launch vehicle, an Ariane 44P rocket, placed ISO successfully into a highly elliptical geocentric orbit, completing one revolution around the Earth every 24 hours. The primary mirror of its Ritchey-Chrétien telescope measured 60 cm in diameter and was cooled to 1.7 kelvins by means of superfluid helium. The ISO satellite contained four instruments that allowed for imaging and photometry from 2.5 to 240 micrometres and spectroscopy from 2.5 to 196.8 micrometers.

ESA and the Infrared Processing and Analysis Center made efforts to improve the data pipelines and specialized software analysis tools to yield the best quality calibration and data reduction methods from the mission. IPAC supports ISO observers and data archive users through in-house visits and workshops.

== History and development ==
In 1983, the US-Dutch-British IRAS inaugurated space-based infrared astronomy by performing the first-ever 'all-sky survey' at infrared wavelengths. The resulting map of the infrared sky pinpointed some 350,000 infrared sources waiting to be explored by IRAS' successors. In 1979, IRAS was in an advanced stage of planning and the expected results from IRAS led to the first proposal for ISO made to ESA in the same year. With the rapid improvements in infrared detector-technology, ISO was to provide detailed observations for some 30,000 infrared sources with much improved sensitivity and resolution. ISO was to perform 1000 times better in sensitivity and 100 times better in angular resolution at 12 micrometres compared to IRAS.

A number of follow-up studies resulted in the selection of ISO as the next installment for the ESA Scientific Programme in 1983. Next came a Call for Experiment and Mission Scientist Proposals to the scientific community, resulting in the selection of the scientific instruments in 1985. The four instruments chosen were developed by teams of researchers from France, Germany, the Netherlands and United Kingdom.

Design and development of the satellite started in 1986 with Aérospatiale's space division (currently absorbed into Thales Alenia Space) leading an international consortium of 32 companies responsible for manufacture, integration and testing of the new satellite. Final assembly took place at the Cannes Mandelieu Space Center.

== The satellite ==
Animation of Infrared Space Observatory's orbit Infrared Space Observatory · Earth

The basic design of ISO was strongly influenced by that of its immediate predecessor. Like IRAS, ISO was composed of two major components:

- Payload module, composed of a large cryostat holding the telescope and the four scientific instruments.
- Service module, supports the activities of the payload module by providing electrical power, thermal control, attitude and orbit control and telecommunications.

The payload module also held a conical sun shade, to prevent stray light from reaching the telescope, and two large star trackers. The latter were part of the Attitude and Orbit Control Subsystem (AOCS) which provided three-axis stabilisation of ISO with a pointing accuracy of one arc second. It consisted of Sun and Earth sensors, the before-mentioned star trackers, a quadrant star sensor on the telescope axis, gyroscopes and reaction wheels. A complementary reaction control system (RCS), using hydrazine propellant, was responsible for orbital direction and finetuning shortly after launch. The complete satellite weighed just under 2500 kg, was 5.3 m high, 3.6 m wide and measured 2.3 m in depth.

The service module held all the warm electronics, the hydrazine propellant tank and provided up to 600 watts of electrical power by means of solar cells mounted on the sunpointing side of the service module-mounted sunshield. The underside of the service module sported a load-bearing, ring shaped, physical interface for the launch vehicle.

The cryostat of the payload module surrounded the telescope and science instrument with a large dewar containing a toroidal tank loaded with 2268 litres of superfluid helium. Cooling by slow evaporation of the helium kept the temperature of the telescope below 3.4 K and the science instruments below 1.9 K. These very low temperatures were required for the scientific instruments to be sensitive enough to detect the small amount of infrared radiation from cosmic sources. Without this extreme cooling, the telescope and instruments would see only their own intense infrared emissions rather than the faint ones from afar.

== Optical telescope ==
The ISO telescope was mounted on the center line of the dewar, near the bottom-side of the toroidal helium tank. It was of the Ritchey-Chrétien type with an effective entrance pupil of 60 cm, a focal length ratio of 15 and a resulting focal length of 900 cm. Very strict control over straylight, particularly that from bright infrared sources outside the telescope's field of view, was necessary to ensure the guaranteed sensitivity of the scientific instruments. A combination of light-tight shields, baffles inside the telescope and the sunshade on top of the cryostat accomplished full protection against straylight. Furthermore, ISO was constrained from observing too close to the Sun, Earth and Moon; all major sources of infrared radiation. ISO always pointed between 60 and 120 degrees away from the Sun and it never pointed closer than 77 degrees to Earth, 24 degrees to the Moon or closer than 7 degrees to Jupiter. These restrictions meant that at any given time only about 15 percent of the sky was available to ISO.

A pyramid-shaped mirror behind the primary mirror of the telescope distributed the infrared light to the four instruments, providing each of them with a 3 arc-minute section of the 20 arc-minute field of view of the telescope. Thus, pointing of a different instrument to the same cosmic object meant repointing the entire ISO satellite.

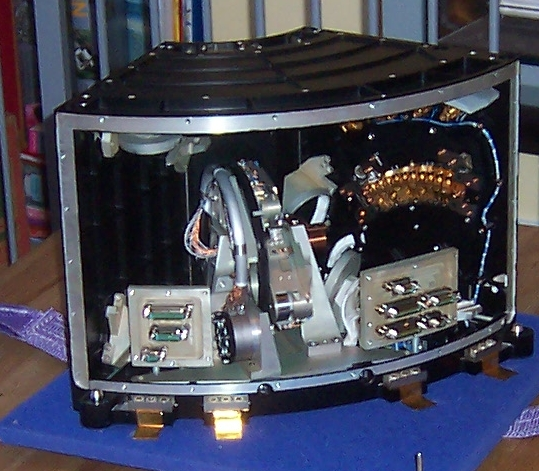
Flight spare for the LWS instrument in ISO

== Instruments ==
ISO carried an array of four scientific instruments for observations in the infrared:

Infrared Camera (ISOCAM)
A high-resolution camera covering 2.5 to 17 micrometre wavelength with two different detectors. Like a visible-light camera it takes pictures of astronomical objects, but the image shows what the object looks like in infrared light.
Photo-polarimeter (ISOPHOT)
An instrument designed to measure the polarisation of infrared radiation emitted from an astronomical object. The very broad wavelength range from 2.4 to 240 micrometre allowed this instrument to see the infrared emissions of even the coldest astronomical objects such as interstellar dust clouds
Short Wave Spectrometer (SWS)
A spectrometer covering the 2.4 to 45 micrometre wavelength. Observations with this instrument provided valuable information about the chemical composition, density and temperature of the universe.
Long Wave Spectrometer (LWS)
A spectrometer covering the 45 to 196.8 micrometre wavelength.

All four instruments were mounted directly behind the primary mirror of the telescope, in a circular arrangement, with each instrument taking up an 80 degree segment of the cylindrical space. The field of view for each instrument was offset to the central axis of the telescope's field of view. This means that every instrument 'saw' a different portion of the sky at a given moment. In standard operational mode one instrument was in primary operation.

== Launch and operations ==
After a very successful development and integration phase ISO was finally launched into orbit on 17 November 1995, on board an Ariane-44P launch vehicle. Performance of the launch vehicle was very good with the apogee only 43 km lower than expected. ESA's Space Operations Centre in Darmstadt in Germany had full control over ISO in the first four days of flight. After early commissioning primary control over ISO was handed over to the Spacecraft Control Centre (SCC) at Villanueva de la Cañada in Spain (VILSPA) for the remainder of the mission. In the first three weeks after launch the orbit was fine-tuned and all satellite systems were activated and tested. Cool-down of the cryostat proved to be more efficient than previously calculated, so the anticipated mission length was extended to 24 months. Between 21 and 26 November all four science instruments were switched on and thoroughly checked out. Between 9 December 1995 and 3 February 1996 the 'Performance Verification Phase' took place, dedicated to commissioning all instruments and fixing problems. Routine observations started from 4 February 1996, and lasted until the last helium coolant depleted on 8 April 1998.

The perigee of ISO's orbit lay well inside the Van Allen radiation belt, forcing the science instruments to be shut down for seven hours during each pass through the radiation belt. Thus, 17 hours in each orbit remained for scientific observation. A typical 24-hour orbit of ISO can be broken down into six phases:

- Acquisition-of-Signal (AOS) by the primary Mission Control Center VILSPA in Spain and activation of the satellite.
- Science operations during the VILSPA window, starting four hours after perigee, and lasting for up to nine hours.
- Handover of operations to the secondary mission control center at Goldstone at apogee. During this 15 minute period the science instruments could not be operated.
- Science operations during the Goldstone window, lasting up to eight hours.
- De-activation of the instruments upon approach of the Van Allen radiation belt and Loss-of-Signal (LOS) at Goldstone.
- Perigee passage.

Contrary to IRAS, no science data was recorded on-board ISO for later transmission to the ground. All data, both science data and housekeeping data were transmitted to the ground in real-time. The perigee point of ISO's orbit was below the radio horizon of the mission control centers at both VILSPA and Goldstone, thus forcing the science instruments to be switched off at perigee.

== End of mission ==
At 07:00 UTC on 8 April 1998 flight controllers at VILSPA noticed a rise in temperature of the telescope. This was a clear sign that the load of superfluid helium coolant had depleted. At 23:07 UTC the same day, the temperature of the science instruments had risen above 4.2 K and science observations were ceased. A few detectors in the SWS instrument were capable of making observations at higher temperatures and remained in use for another 150 hours to make detailed measurements of an additional 300 stars. In the month following depletion of coolant the 'Technology Test Phase' (TTP) was initiated to test several elements of the satellite in off-nominal conditions. After completion of TTP, the perigee of ISO's orbit was lowered sufficiently enough to ensure ISO will burn up in Earth's atmosphere in 20 to 30 years after shutdown. ISO was then permanently switched off on 16 May 1998 at 12:00 UTC.

== Results ==
On average, ISO performed 45 observations in each 24-hour orbit. Throughout its lifetime of over 900 orbits ISO performed more than 26,000 successful scientific observations. The huge amounts of scientific data generated by ISO was subject to extensive archiving activities up to 2006. The full data-set has been available to the scientific community since 1998 and many discoveries have been made, with probably many more still to come:

- ISO detected the presence of water vapour in starforming regions, in the vicinity of stars at the end of their lives, in sources very close to the Galactic Centre, in the atmospheres of planets in the Solar System and in the Orion Nebula.
- Planet formation was detected around old, dying stars. This discovery contradicted theories that planet formation was only possible around young stars.
- Hydrogen fluoride gas was for the first time detected in interstellar gas clouds.
- The first detection of the earliest stages of stellar formation. The pre-stellar core L1689B was found and studied in great detail with ISO's LWS instrument.
- ISO discovered large amounts of cosmic dust in the previously thought empty space between galaxies.
- Observations of the most-luminous object in the universe, Arp 220, revealed that the source for its enormous emission of infrared radiation is an outburst of star formation.
- Observations with the LWS instrument confirmed the previous discovery by IRAS of large cloud-like structures of very cold hydrocarbons radiating primarily in the infrared. These infrared cirrus clouds affect the energy balance of the entire universe, acting as a kind of galactic refrigerator.
- ISO searched for, and found several protoplanetary disks: rings or disks of material around stars which are considered to be the first stage of planet formation.
- ISO pointed its sensitive instruments on several of the planets in the Solar System to determine the chemical composition of their atmospheres.

== See also ==
- Infrared Array Camera (Spitzer near to mid infrared camera)
- List of largest infrared telescopes
- Near Infrared Camera and Multi-Object Spectrometer (NICMOS, Hubble near-infrared instrument installed in 1997)
