= Infrared cirrus =

Cloudlike galactic structures

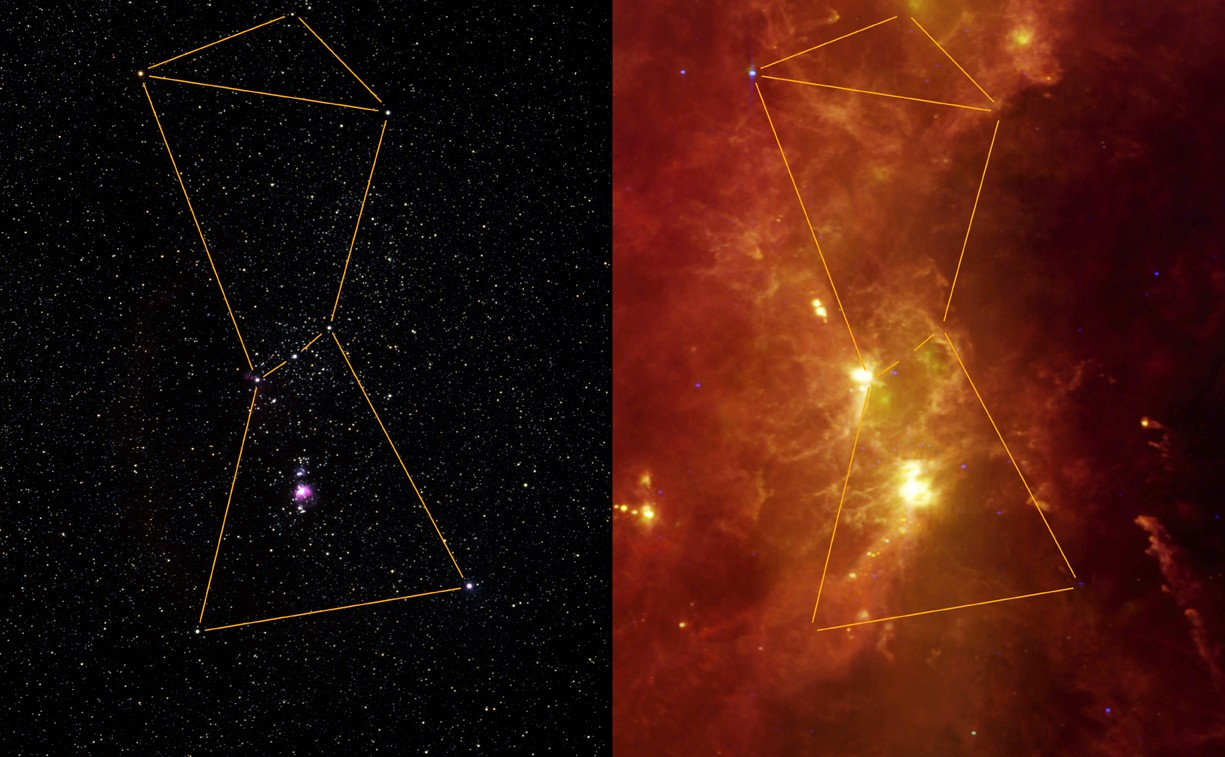
Infrared galactic cirrus and other structures seen in infrared by NASA/IRAS in the constellation of Orion (right).

Infrared cirrus or galactic cirrus are galactic filamentary structures seen in space over most of the sky that emit far-infrared light. The name is given because the structures are cloud-like in appearance. These structures were first detected by the Infrared Astronomy Satellite at wavelengths of 60 and 100 micrometres.

== See also ==
- Galaxy filament
- Cosmic infrared background
