= X-ray background =

The observed X-ray background is thought to result from, below 0.3 keV, galactic X-ray emission, the galactic X-ray background, and, above 0.3 keV, from a combination of numerous X-ray point sources outside of the Milky Way, the cosmic X-ray background (CXB, XRB, CXRB).

== History ==
In 1962, in a project led by Riccardo Giacconi, Herbert Gursky, Frank R. Paolini, and Bruno B. Rossi, Geiger counters mounted on a rocket detected a "diffuse background radiation" of X-ray flux spanning all directions covered by the rocket's rotation. This X-ray background flux was understood to consist primarily of X-rays with energy of "several tens of keV". Analysis showed that the flux originate from outside of the solar system, but it was unclear whether such sources are galactic or extragalactic.

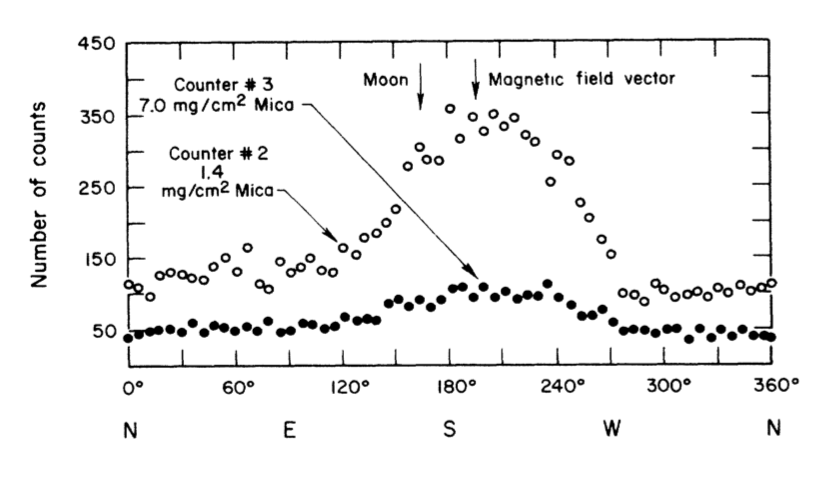
Figure from Giacconi+1962 showing X-ray flux detected in all directions of the Geiger counter's rotation

This background X-ray flux discovered by Giacconi et al. was later characterized as an isotropic background of hard X-rays (with energies greater than 2 keV) of extragalactic origins, while other rocket-based studies detected an anisotropic X-ray flux of energies around 0.2 keV, believed to be emitted by sources within the Milky Way.

With the improved angular resolution and longer observation times made possible by newly launched X-ray satellite missions since the 1970s, the nature of both components of the X-ray background became better understood. Observations from the Einstein Observatory revealed that the cosmic X-ray background (CXB) originates from discrete distant sources, which were hypothesized and later confirmed to be active galactic nuclei (AGN). The galactic component of the X-ray background was surveyed by ROSAT, which revealed resolved structures of the galactic X-ray-emitting sources.

The following generation of X-ray missions, including Chandra and XMM-Newton, further propelled the understanding of the cosmic X-ray background. Observations show that 94.3% of CXB emissions in soft X-rays (between 0.5-2 keV) and 88.8% of cosmic X-ray background emissions in hard X-rays (between 2-10 keV) could be attributed to resolved point sources, such as AGN, quasars, and thermal bremsstrahlung emissions from galaxy clusters.

== See also ==
- X-ray astronomy
- Wilkinson Microwave Anisotropy Probe
- S150 Galactic X-Ray Mapping
