= UDF =

UDF may refer to:

== Astronomy ==
- Ultra Deep Field, a view of the distant universe taken in 2004 by the Hubble space telescope
  - UDF 423, a distant spiral galaxy
  - UDF 2457, a red dwarf star

== Computing ==
- Universal Disk Format, an operating-system-independent file system commonly used on DVD and other digital media
- Uniqueness Database File, a Windows XP Professional configuration text file
- User-defined function, a function provided by the user of a program or environment

== Organizations ==
=== Politics ===
- United Democratic Forces (ОДС), an electoral alliance in Bulgaria
- United Democratic Forces of Belarus, a coalition of political parties participating as the main opposition group during the 2006 presidential election
- United Democratic Front (Botswana)
- United Democratic Front (Kerala), India
- United Democratic Front (Mizoram), India
- United Democratic Front (Malawi)
- United Democratic Front (Namibia)
- United Democratic Front (Pakistan)
- United Democratic Front (South Africa)
- United Democratic Front (South Sudan)
- United Democratic Forum Party, a former political party in Kenya
- Union pour la Démocratie Française (Union for French Democracy), a former centrist pro-European French political party

=== Military ===
- Ulster Defence Force, a paramilitary group in Northern Ireland
- Union Defence Force (South Africa), the predecessor of the South African Defence Force from 1912 to 1957
- Union Defence Force (UAE), the armed forces of the United Arab Emirates

=== Other organizations ===
- United Dairy Farmers, an American chain of ice cream shops

== Other uses ==
- Unducted fan, another name for a propfan engine
- United Defense Force, a fictional global military in the manga All You Need Is Kill and its film adaptation Edge of Tomorrow

== See also ==
- Union of Democratic Forces (disambiguation), several political parties
