= Hubble Legacy Field =

Hubble Space Telescope image of a small region of space

The Hubble Legacy Field image containing 16 years' worth of data from the Hubble Space Telescope

Deep fields within the Hubble Legacy Field

The Hubble Legacy Field is an image of a small region of space in the constellation Fornax, containing an estimated 265,000 galaxies. The original release was composed of Hubble Space Telescope data accumulated over a 16-year period. Looking back approximately 13 billion years (between 400 and 800 million years after the Big Bang) it has been used to search for galaxies that existed at that time. It is considered the largest amount of galaxies captured by the Hubble Space Telescope in one image. The image was taken in a section of the sky with a low density of bright stars in the near-field, allowing much better viewing of dimmer, more distant objects. It builds on the data collected for the Hubble Ultra-Deep Field, the Hubble eXtreme Deep Field and the Great Observatories Origins Deep Survey.

Located southwest of Orion in the southern-hemisphere constellation Fornax, the approximately rectangular image is about 25 arcminutes to an edge. This is almost the angular diameter of a full moon viewed from Earth (which is about 31 arcminutes, or a half a degree).

The images and data release were announced on May 2, 2019, by NASA. The most recent data release for the GOODS-North/South is Hubble Legacy Field Data Release V2.5 which includes 13,308 exposures with a total exposure duration of 10 million seconds covering UV, optical, and infrared images, including the original dataset from the previous versions. These high-resolution images in various wavelength ranges in the new data release enable astronomers to create spectral energy distributions, which aids in the construction of the GOODS-S Photometric Catalog via photometric analysis. In a 2024 paper, the GOODS-S data was shown to exhibit an extreme galaxy overdensity at redshift z = 5.4 by observations made by the Near Infrared Camera (NIRCam) instrument aboard James Webb Space Telescope (JWST). These observations allowed for the discovery of a large-scale structure in the GOODS-S data, consisting of stellar populations within surrounding galaxies and associated dark matter halos, which were characterized and then used to refine previous models of galaxy formation and evolution directly after the Epoch of Reionization (z > 6). For context, this characterization of redshift data provided by these stellar populations extends back in time to roughly 1 billion years after the Big Bang, or 600,000 years after the Cosmic microwave background was formed due to recombination.

== Planning ==
As with the earlier fields, this one was required to contain very little emission from our galaxy, with little Zodiacal dust. The field was also required to be in a range of declinations such that it could be observed both by southern hemisphere instruments, such as the Atacama Large Millimeter Array, and northern hemisphere ones, such as those located on Hawaii. It was ultimately decided to observe a section of the Chandra Deep Field South, due to existing deep X-ray observations from Chandra X-ray Observatory and two interesting objects already observed in the Great Observatories Origins Deep Survey sample at the same location: a redshift 5.8 galaxy and a supernova. The coordinates of the field are right ascension 3^{h} 33^{m} , declination −27° 47′ (J2000).

== Observations ==
The Hubble Legacy Field comprises data from 7,500 exposures, with a total exposure time of 250 days.

== Video ==
Hubble Legacy Field (50-second video)

== See also ==
- List of deep fields
- List of UDF objects (1–500)
