= United Democratic Front =

United Democratic Front may refer to:

- United Democratic Front (Botswana)
- United Democratic Front (Kerala), India
- United Democratic Front (Mizoram), India
- United Democratic Front (Malawi)
- United Democratic Front (Namibia)
- United Democratic Front (Pakistan)
- United Democratic Front (South Africa)
- United Democratic Front (South Sudan)

== See also ==
- All India United Democratic Front
- Swaziland United Democratic Front
- Uttar Pradesh United Democratic Front (India)
- Union of Democratic Forces (disambiguation)
- United Democratic Forces (disambiguation)
- United Front for Democratic Change (Chad)
