= Union Defence Force =

The Union Defence Force may refer to a former or current military organization:

- Union Defence Force (South Africa), the predecessor of the South African Defence Force from 1912 to 1957
- Union Defence Force (UAE), the armed forces of the United Arab Emirates

== See also ==
- UDF (disambiguation)
