= Massimo Stiavelli =

Italian-American astronomer

Massimo Stiavelli (born 12 May 1961, Montecatini Terme (Pistoia), Italy) is an Italian-American astronomer who spent most of his career at the Space Telescope Science Institute in Baltimore (STScI, MD, USA). He has worked in both theoretical and observational astrophysics, as well as participated in the development of instruments for the Hubble Space Telescope and the James Webb Space Telescope mission. He is a Foreign Member of the Italian Accademia Nazionale dei Lincei, a fellow of the Royal Astronomical Society, and a fellow of the American Association for the Advancement of Science.

== Education and career ==
Stiavelli studied physics at the University of Pisa and at the Scuola Normale Superiore di Pisa, where he received a PhD in physics in 1986. At the Scuola Normale Superiore, he worked under the supervision of Luigi Arialdo Radicati di Brozolo and Giuseppe Bertin. Following his PhD, he was a postdoctoral research assistant at Rutgers University, a Fellow at the European Southern Observatory in Garching (Germany), and a researcher at the Scuola Normale Superiore. He joined the Space Telescope Science Institute in 1995 as a European Space Agency Astronomer and later as an STScI Astronomer. He became the acting Mission Head for the James Webb Space Telescope in 2012. He was confirmed as the Mission Head in 2013. He led the development of the science and flight operations for the James Webb Space Telescope (JWST) at STScI. For his work on JWST he received the NASA Outstanding Public Leadership Medal in 2022. Stiavelli has been interviewed by the American Institute of Physics for their oral history project.

== Research ==
Stiavelli's research in the field of cosmology focuses on the formation and evolution of galaxies and central black holes. In 2004, he was the Home Lead for the Hubble Ultra-Deep Field. Most of Stiavelli's research since 2004 has been on high-redshift galaxies.

== Awards ==
- Fellow of the American Association for the Advancement of Sciences
- Foreign Member of the Accademia Nazionale dei Lincei
- Cavaliere dell’Ordine della Stella d’Italia

== Selected publications ==
He is the author of a monograph published by Wiley (publisher) and more than 160 refereed publications, with more than 24,000 citations.

- From First Light to Reionization: The End of the Dark Ages, WILEY-VCH; 1st Edition (April 20, 2009) ISBN 978-3527407057
- 2025 with T. Morishita, M. Chiaberge, et al., What Can We Learn from the Nitrogen Abundance of High-z Galaxies?, in: The Astrophysical Journal. Vol. 981, nº 2; 136.
- 2023 with T. Morishita, M. Chiaberge, et al., The Puzzling Properties of the MACS1149-JD1 Galaxy at z = 9.11, in: The Astrophysical Journal. Vol. 957, nº 2; L18.
- 2010 with M. Trenti, The Clustering Properties of the First Galaxies, in: The Astrophysical Journal. Vol. 716, nº 2; L190.
- 2005 with S. G. Djorgovski, C. Pavlovsky, et al., Evidence of Primordial Clustering around the QSO SDSS J1030+0524 at z=6.28, in: The Astrophysical Journal. Vol. 622, nº 1; L1.
- 2004 with S. M. Fall, N. Panagia, The Possible Detection of Cosmological Reionization Sources, in: The Astrophysical Journal. Vol. 610, nº 1; L1.
- 1992 with J. Biretta, P. Møller, W. W. Zeilinger, Optical counterpart of the east radio lobe of M87, in: Nature. Vol. 355, nº 6363; 802.
