= UDF 2457 =

Star in the constellation Fornax

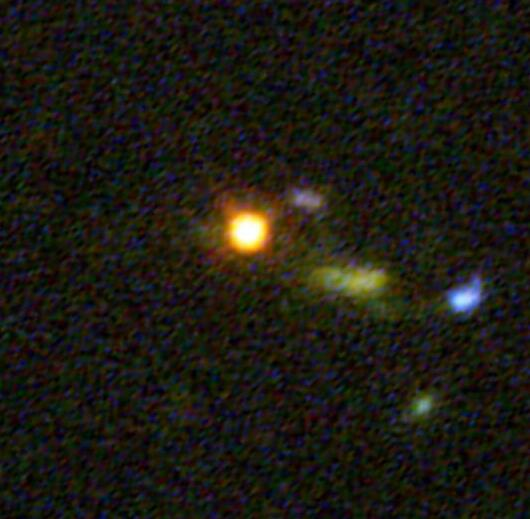
- Red dwarf star UDF 2457 as seen by the Hubble Ultra Deep Field (UDF); Credit: STScI, NASA, ESA

Observation data Epoch J2000 Equinox ICRS
- Constellation: Fornax
- Right ascension: 03^{h} 32^{m} 38.79^{s}
- Declination: −27° 48′ 10.0″
- Apparent magnitude (V): 25

Characteristics
- Spectral type: (early?) M dwarf

Astrometry
Distance	59,000 ly

Details

Database references
SIMBAD	data
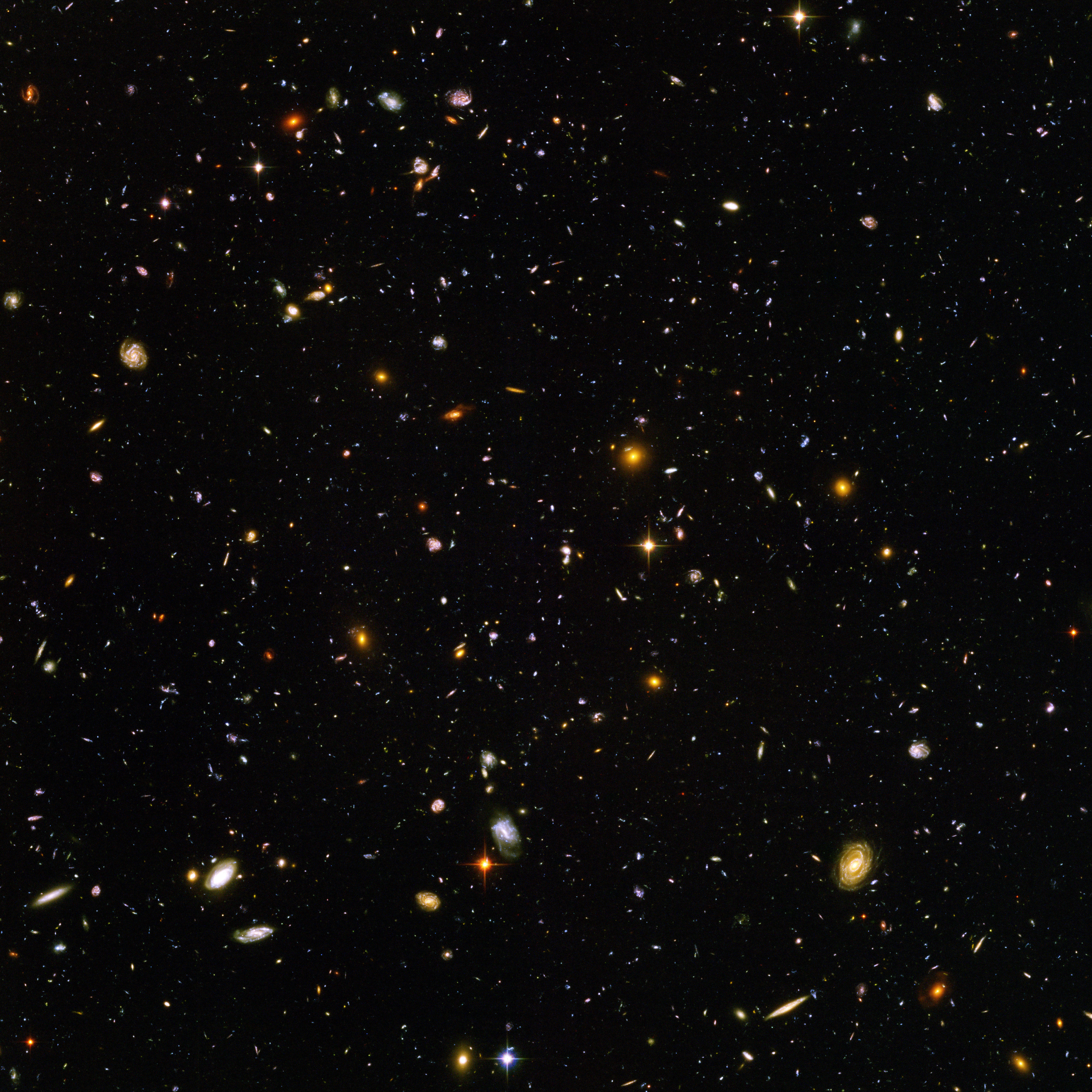
- UDF 2457 is located above the spiral galaxy UDF 423 in the lower right quadrant of the Hubble Ultra Deep Field.

UDF 2457 is the Hubble Ultra Deep Field (UDF) identifier for a red dwarf star calculated to be about 59,000 light-years (18 kiloparsecs) from Earth with a very dim apparent magnitude of 25.

The Milky Way galaxy is about 100,000 light-years in diameter, and the Sun is about 25,000 light-years from the Galactic Center. The small common star UDF 2457 may be one of the farthest known stars inside the main body of the Milky Way. Globular clusters (such as Messier 13 and NGC 2419) and stellar streams are located farther out in the galactic halo.

== See also ==
- UDFj-39546284 – farthest galaxy seen by the Hubble Ultra-Deep Field
