= Union of Democratic Forces =

Union of Democratic Forces or Union of the Democratic Forces is the name of:

- Union of Democratic Forces (Bulgaria)
- Union of the Democratic Forces (France)
- Union of Democratic Forces of Guinea
- Union of Democratic Forces (Mauritania)
- Union of Democratic Forces (Republic of the Congo)

== See also ==
- Turkmen Union of Democratic Forces
- Union of Democratic Forces for Progress, Mali
- Union of Democratic Forces for Unity, Central African Republic
- United Democratic Forces (disambiguation)
- United Democratic Front (disambiguation)
