= Abell S1063 =

Galaxy cluster in the constellation of Grus

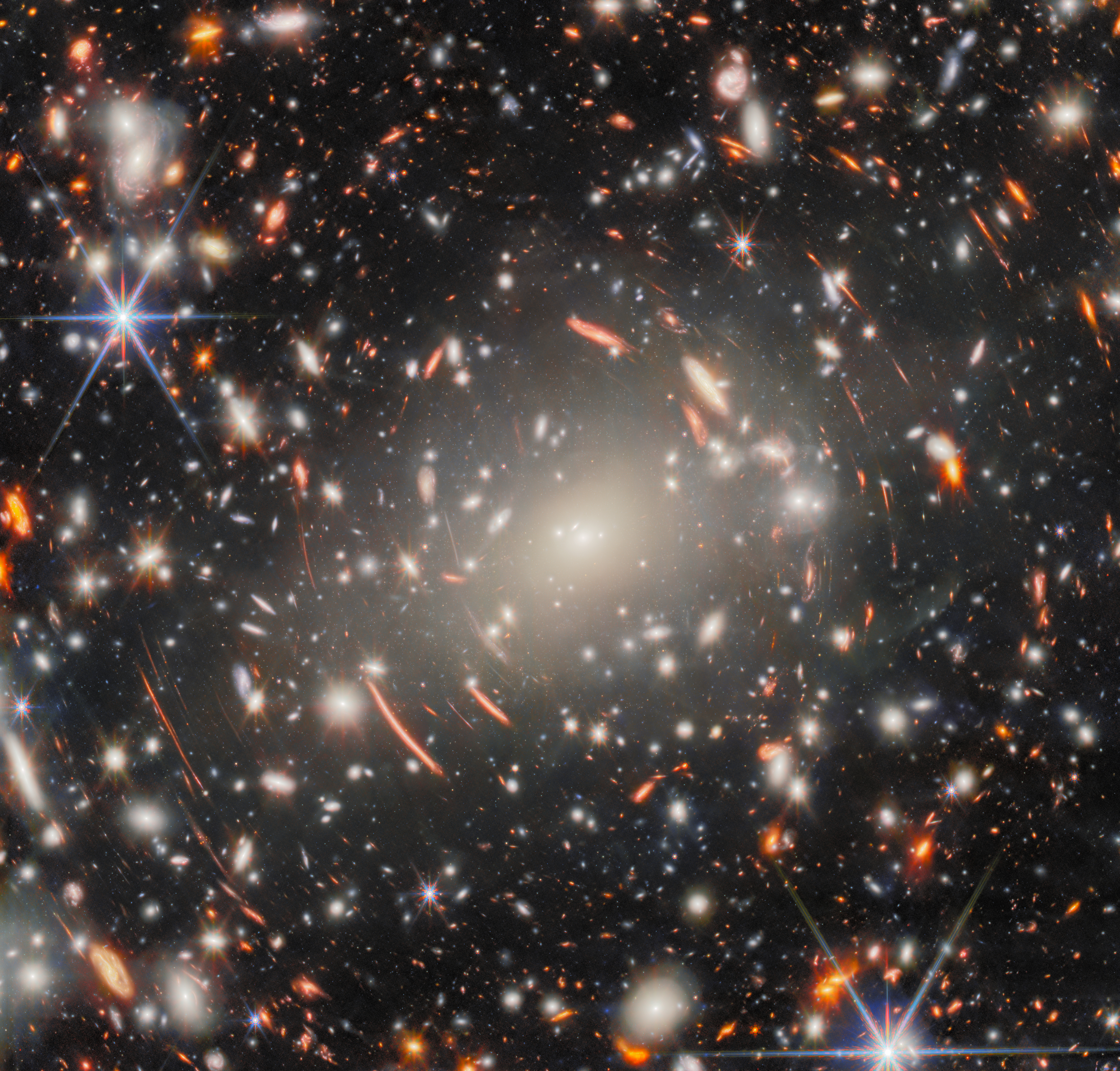
- Abell S1063 imaged by the James Webb Space Telescope

Observation data (Epoch J2000)
- Constellation: Grus
- Right ascension: 22^{h} 48^{m} 54.3^{s}
- Declination: −44° 31′ 07″
- Redshift: 0.351

Other designations
- ACO S 1063, MCXC J2248.7-4431, PSZ2 G349.46-59.95, 1RXS J224843.7-443143, BAX 342.2263-44.5187, PLCKESZ G349.46-59.94, RBS 1898, SPT-CL J2248-4431, 2MAXI J2250-445, PSZ1 G349.46-59.92, RXC J2248.7-4431, [DBG99] 118

Abell S1063 is a cluster of galaxies located in the constellation Grus. The collection of galaxies lying 4.5 billion light-years from Earth dominates the scene. Abell S1063 is surrounded by glowing streaks of light which are faint galaxies from the beginning of the universe.

Before the James Webb Space Telescope researched the cluster, Abell S1063 was previously observed by the NASA/ESA Hubble Space Telescope’s Frontier Fields program. The galaxy cluster creates a gravitational lens and distorts galaxies behind it as a result of its gravity. Like a glass lens, it focuses the light from these faraway galaxies. The resulting images, albeit distorted, are both bright and magnified – enough to be observed and studied. This was the aim of Hubble’s observations, using the galaxy cluster as a magnifying glass to investigate the early universe.

This image is what’s known as a deep field – a long exposure of a single area of the sky, collecting as much light as possible to draw out the most faint and distant galaxies that don’t appear in ordinary images. With 9 separate snapshots of different near-infrared wavelengths of light, totaling around 120 hours of observation time and aided by the magnifying effect of gravitational lensing, this is Webb’s deepest gaze on a single target to date. Focusing such observing power on a massive gravitational lens, like Abell S1063, therefore has the potential to reveal some of the very first galaxies formed in the early universe.

== Image gallery ==
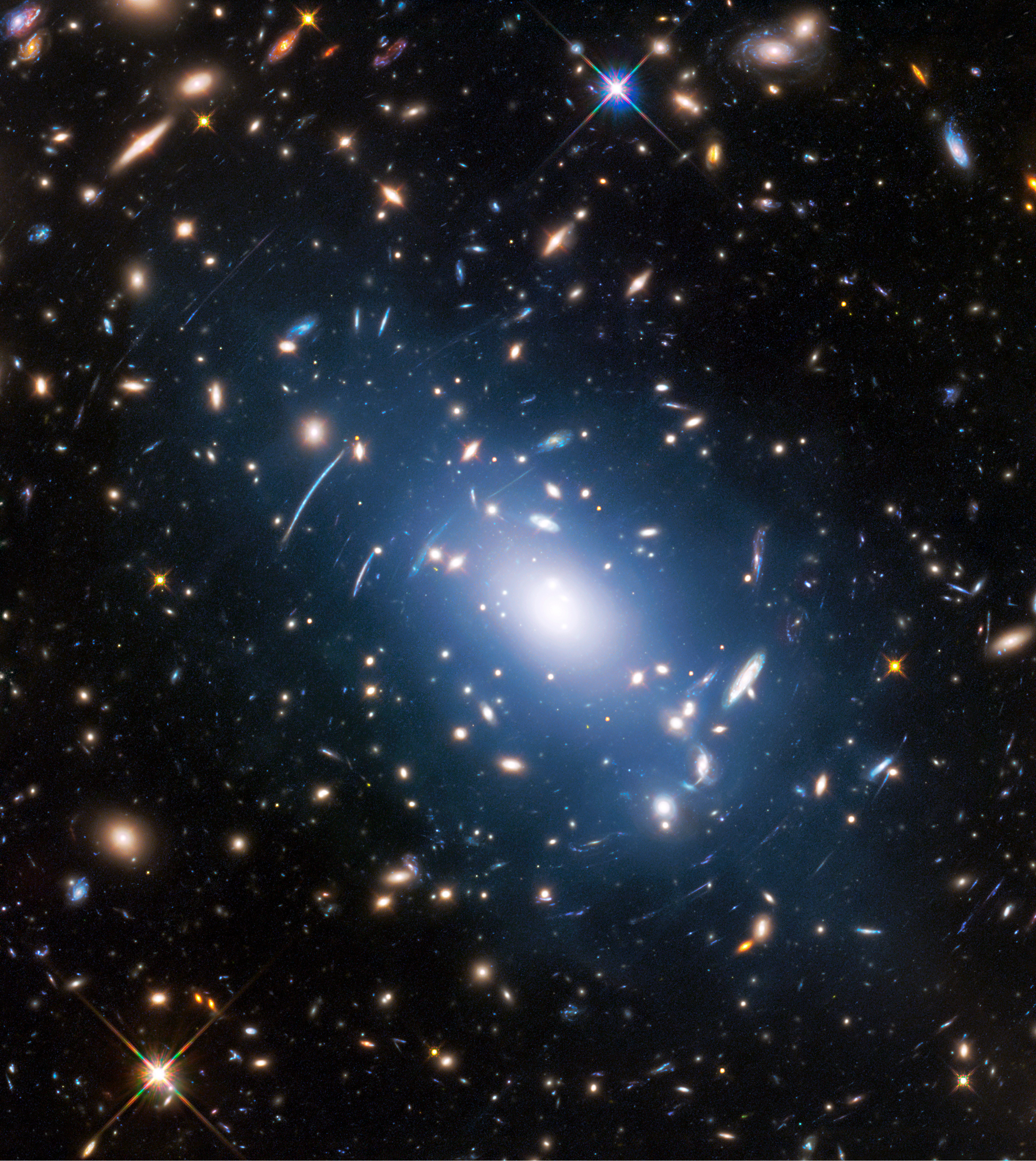
Hubble image of the galaxy cluster Abell S1063.
