= Awdy Kulyýew =

Turkmen politician (1936–2007)

Awdy Öwezkuliýewiç Kulyýew (30 July 1936 – 10 April 2007) served as the first foreign minister of Turkmenistan. A former diplomat, he was Soviet chargé d'affaires to Oman and Qatar. He resigned as Foreign Minister in 1992 and left Turkmenistan, opposing the government of President Saparmyrat Nyýazow.

== Early career ==
He was born on 30 July 1936 in the Turkmen capital of Ashgabad into a family of employees. A philologist by education, he worked after graduation, as a researcher at the Institute of Language and Literature of the Academy of Sciences of the Turkmen SSR. He was a trainee researcher at the Institute of Asian Peoples, and soon after became head of the Russian language courses at the Soviet Cultural Center in Taiz (1960-1971). From 1971 to 1987, he was the Soviet Chargé d'Affaires in the Sultanate of Oman and the State of Qatar. In the final years of the Soviet Union, he was an advisor to the Office of the Middle East and North Africa of the Ministry of Foreign Affairs.

== Turkmenistan ==
From 1990 to 1992 he was the Minister of Foreign Affairs of Turkmenistan. He resigned in 1992, opposing the government of President Saparmyrat Nyýazow. On 17 April 1998, he was detained at the Ashgabat International Airport. A few days later, President of Turkmenistan Saparmyrat Nyýazow, speaking in the United States, publicly stated that Kulyýew was a criminal and terrorist associated with the Russian special services. After the incident with Kulyýew became an international scandal, the staff of the Russian embassy assisted in the release of Kulyýew and in his subsequent departure to Russia. Later that May, the heads of the law enforcement agencies of Turkmenistan in their television speeches accused Kulyýew of being a criminal offender. Referring to this circumstance, the KNB of Turkmenistan refused to return to Kulyýew his Russian foreign passport, which is the property of Russia. Appeals sent by Kuliev to the Russian embassy on this matter remained unanswered.

== Exile and death ==
He arrived in Norway, where the United Turkmen Opposition was formed in 2002 with Kulyýew as its leader. He was brutally beaten near his home on the outskirts of Moscow in August 2003, in an attack he believed was ordered by agents of the Turkmen government. Three months earlier, Kulyýew was publicly threatened by President Nyýazow who said that "it is time to send him to another world."

He was living in exile in Moscow as of August 2005 when Journeyman Pictures interviewed him secretly for a documentary about Turkmenistan. During the interview Kulyýew claimed that following the failed coup of 25 November 2002 many former ministers, members of government and business leaders were arrested and tortured in Turkmenistan's jails. Upon Nyýazow's death in 2006, Kulyýew stated that "It is a great joy for all of us that he has freed the country from himself". He died on 10 April 2007 in Oslo, Norway, after undergoing stomach surgery two days earlier. He was not allowed by the Turkmen government to be buried in Turkmenistan, which was reportedly his last request.

Political offices
Preceded by Office Established	Minister of Foreign Affairs of Turkmenistan; 1990–1992	Succeeded by Halykberdi Ataýew
