= Duoth Koang Rueh Wour =

South Sudanese politician

Duoth Koang Rueh Wour is a South Sudanese politician, belonging to the United Democratic Front. He was elected to the Jonglei State Legislative Assembly in 2010 as a UDF party list candidate (the sole non-SPLM party list candidate elected).

== Bibliography ==
- Ruea, Duoth Koang, Chol, Gatwech Peter Kulang. Bok Cäätni Kolang Toat; Nuer ( Kolang ) Folk Stories : Part One . ( Reader for Advanced Pupils ). Nairobi: Institute of Regional Languages - SIL Sudan, 2001
