= List of UDF objects (1–500) =

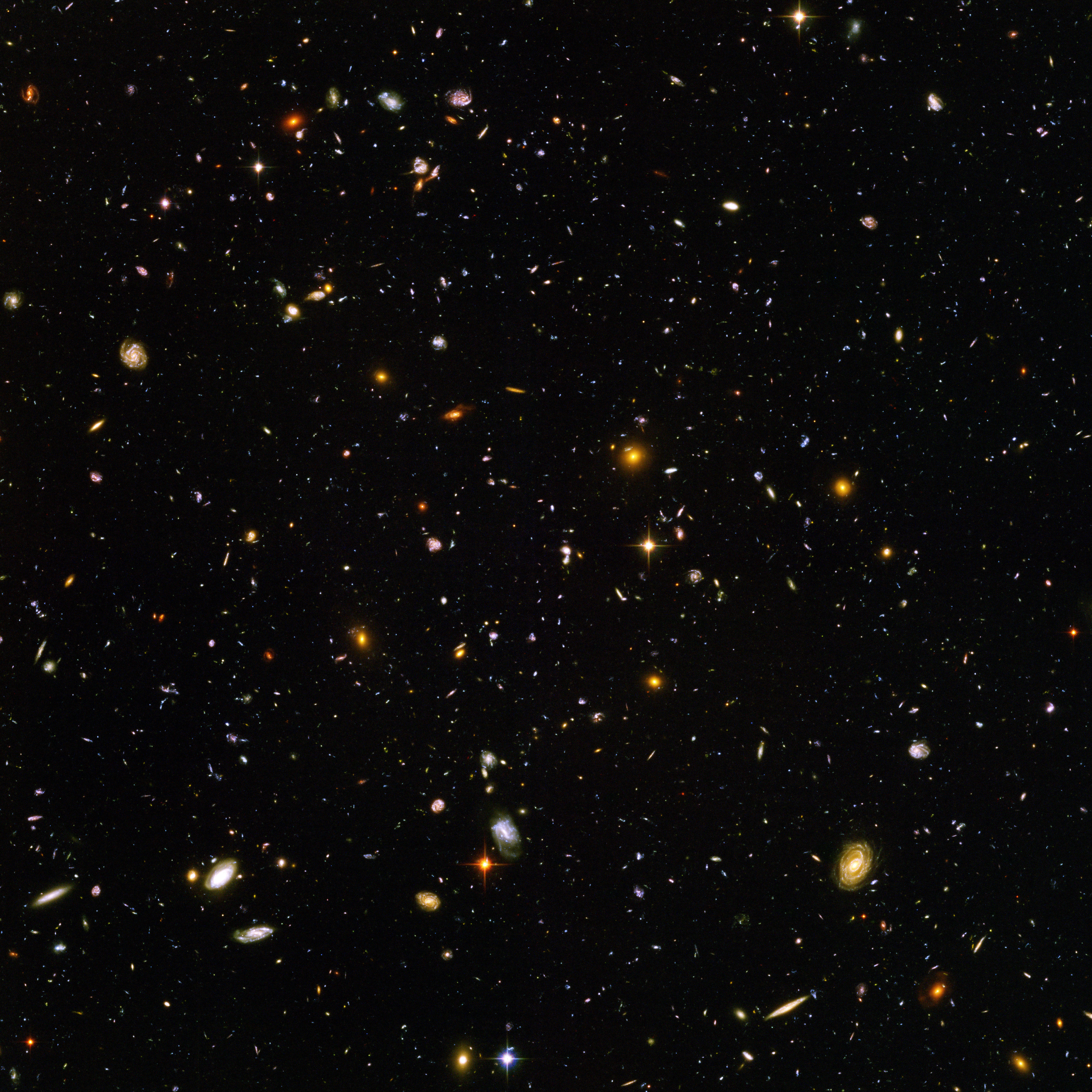
This is the original image of the Hubble Ultra-Deep Field.

This is a list of UDF objects 1-500 from the Hubble Ultra Deep Field (UDF). The Hubble Ultra Deep Field is a small region of the sky in the constellation of Fornax. The data in these tables is from the SIMBAD Astronomical Database, and the apparent magnitude data is from Wikisky.

== 1–100 ==
UDF number	Object type	Right ascension (J2000)	Declination (J2000)	Apparent magnitude	Redshift
1	Galaxy	03^{h} 32^{m} 39.72^{s}	−27° 49′ 42.5″	23	0.53428
2	Unknown	03^{h} 32^{m} 39.478^{s}	−27° 49′ 45.44″	30	~
5	Galaxy	03^{h} 32^{m} 39.3684^{s}	−27° 49′ 44.007″	27	0.69
7	Galaxy	03^{h} 32^{m} 39.4512^{s}	−27° 49′ 42.945″	25	0.61
8	Galaxy	03^{h} 32^{m} 39.54334^{s}	−27° 49′ 28.3944″	23	0.6691
13	Galaxy	03^{h} 32^{m} 39.3248^{s}	−27° 49′ 39.053″	25	0.52
14	Galaxy	03^{h} 32^{m} 38.47^{s}	−27° 49′ 31.76″	24	0.6669
15	Galaxy	03^{h} 32^{m} 38.8459^{s}	−27° 49′ 30.29″	27	4.23
19	Star	03^{h} 32^{m} 38.958^{s}	−27° 49′ 37.03″	25	~
21	Galaxy	03^{h} 32^{m} 40.05058^{s}	−27° 49′ 37.0776″	28	1.4
22	Galaxy	03^{h} 32^{m} 38.9566^{s}	−27° 49′ 38.328″	27	3.23 ± 0.41
23	Galaxy	03^{h} 32^{m} 39.883^{s}	−27° 49′ 39.43″	30	3.982 ± 3.598
25	Galaxy	03^{h} 32^{m} 39.903^{s}	−27° 49′ 39.27″	30	4.128 ± 3.726
28	Galaxy	03^{h} 32^{m} 39.565^{s}	−27° 49′ 38.04″	29	3.615 ± 0.543
33	Galaxy	03^{h} 32^{m} 39.1798^{s}	−27° 49′ 36.132″	26	0.95
36	Galaxy	03^{h} 32^{m} 39.8202^{s}	−27° 49′ 33.94″	26	0.44
44	Galaxy	03^{h} 32^{m} 40.314^{s}	−27° 49′ 35.52″	28	3.612 ± 0.542
55	Galaxy	03^{h} 32^{m} 39.0418^{s}	−27° 49′ 32.984″	26	0.47
67	Galaxy	03^{h} 32^{m} 39.531^{s}	−27° 49′ 32.61″	31	4.683 ± 0.668
68	Galaxy	03^{h} 32^{m} 38.8182^{s}	−27° 49′ 28.439″	24	0.82
79	Galaxy	03^{h} 32^{m} 40.246^{s}	−27° 49′ 31.51″	29	3.512 ± 3.284
82	Galaxy	03^{h} 32^{m} 40.79^{s}	−27° 49′ 26.5″	25	1.41
84	Galaxy	03^{h} 32^{m} 37.8376^{s}	−27° 49′ 29.897″	27	3.11 ± 0.4
86	Galaxy	03^{h} 32^{m} 40.10352^{s}	−27° 49′ 27.7345″	25	0.77
89	Galaxy	03^{h} 32^{m} 38.1824^{s}	−27° 49′ 29.968″	27	0.75
91	Galaxy	03^{h} 32^{m} 40.931^{s}	−27° 49′ 28.8″	29	3.739 ± 3.397
95	Galaxy	03^{h} 32^{m} 40.071^{s}	−27° 49′ 26.673″	26	1.4
97	Galaxy	03^{h} 32^{m} 40.95854^{s}	−27° 49′ 25.6746″	25	2.6918
99	Galaxy	03^{h} 32^{m} 40.75^{s}	−27° 49′ 25.8″	25	2.81 ± 0.37
100	Galaxy	03^{h} 32^{m} 40.3446^{s}	−27° 49′ 23.497″	25	0.25

== 101-200 ==
UDF number	Object type	Right ascension (J2000)	Declination (J2000)	Apparent magnitude	Redshift
102	Galaxy	03^{h} 32^{m} 39.234^{s}	−27° 49′ 27.72″	29	3.503 ± 3.209
103	Galaxy	03^{h} 32^{m} 40.75^{s}	−27° 49′ 26.4″	26	1.810 ± 0.33
107	Galaxy	03^{h} 32^{m} 40.175^{s}	−27° 49′ 27.4″	28	0.8 ± 1.621
117	Galaxy	03^{h} 32^{m} 39.164^{s}	−27° 49′ 26.61″	29	0.438 ± 2.001
119	Galaxy	03^{h} 32^{m} 40.248^{s}	−27° 49′ 26.13″	29	5.09
123	Galaxy	03^{h} 32^{m} 39.8417^{s}	−27° 49′ 25.945″	31	4.808 ± 0.683
126	Galaxy	03^{h} 32^{m} 37.61098^{s}	−27° 49′ 22.8954″	26	2.21
129	Galaxy	03^{h} 32^{m} 40.179^{s}	−27° 49′ 26.14″	31	1.414 ± 1.172
131	Galaxy	03^{h} 32^{m} 39.6413^{s}	−27° 49′ 24.257″	27	3.06 ± 0.4
148	Galaxy	03^{h} 32^{m} 39.4892^{s}	−27° 49′ 23.392″	28	4.34
153	Galaxy	03^{h} 32^{m} 39.5987^{s}	−27° 49′ 09.602″	23	0.98
154	Galaxy	03^{h} 32^{m} 39.806^{s}	−27° 49′ 24.4″	29	3.436 ± 0.557
163	Galaxy	03^{h} 32^{m} 41.015^{s}	−27° 49′ 22.463″	27	0.6
166	Galaxy	03^{h} 32^{m} 38.5301^{s}	−27° 49′ 21.681″	26	1.12
168	Galaxy	03^{h} 32^{m} 37.4141^{s}	−27° 49′ 19.992″	24	0.41
176	Galaxy	03^{h} 32^{m} 38.0106^{s}	−27° 49′ 22.184″	27	0.15
178	Galaxy	03^{h} 32^{m} 38.6591^{s}	−27° 49′ 18.858″	24	0.66
197	Galaxy	03^{h} 32^{m} 40.4465^{s}	−27° 49′ 20.638″	28	4.41

== 201-300 ==
UDF number	Object type	Right ascension (J2000)	Declination (J2000)	Apparent magnitude	Redshift
201	Galaxy	03^{h} 32^{m} 39.599^{s}	−27° 49′ 20.67″	29	4.6
204	Galaxy	03^{h} 32^{m} 40.52^{s}	−27° 49′ 21.58″	31	4.734 ± 0.674
206	Galaxy	03^{h} 32^{m} 41.22^{s}	−27° 49′ 18.4″	24	0.9329
213	Galaxy	03^{h} 32^{m} 41.5116^{s}	−27° 49′ 19.9″	27	3.14 ± 0.41
221	Galaxy	03^{h} 32^{m} 37.0527^{s}	−27° 49′ 17.334″	24	1.145
230	Galaxy	03^{h} 32^{m} 36.9591^{s}	−27° 49′ 16.242″	26	3.7 ± 0.46
235	Galaxy	03^{h} 32^{m} 40.9142^{s}	−27° 49′ 17.734″	26	0.69
236	Galaxy	03^{h} 32^{m} 37.092^{s}	−27° 49′ 19.72″	29	3.49 ± 3.194
237	Galaxy	03^{h} 32^{m} 39.3681^{s}	−27° 49′ 17.883″	26	2.99
251	Galaxy	03^{h} 32^{m} 36.9063^{s}	−27° 49′ 17.42″	26	1.03
259	Galaxy	03^{h} 32^{m} 36.8346^{s}	−27° 49′ 16.984″	26	3.23
267	Galaxy	03^{h} 32^{m} 36.8346^{s}	−27° 49′ 17.283″	27	1.25
268	Galaxy	03^{h} 32^{m} 40.2174^{s}	−27° 49′ 15.207″	27	3.11 ± 0.4
280	Galaxy	03^{h} 32^{m} 37.465^{s}	−27° 49′ 16.4″	28	4.023 ± 0.591
285	Galaxy	03^{h} 32^{m} 38.1225^{s}	−27° 49′ 13.264″	25	0.59
287	Galaxy	03^{h} 32^{m} 39.8584^{s}	−27° 49′ 13.97″	26	0.75
291	Galaxy	03^{h} 32^{m} 41.782^{s}	−27° 49′ 15.86″	29	3.688 ± 0.551
295	Galaxy	03^{h} 32^{m} 39.5811^{s}	−27° 49′ 12.782″	26	1.08

== 301-400 ==
UDF number	Object type	Right ascension (J2000)	Declination (J2000)	Apparent magnitude	Redshift
301	Galaxy	03^{h} 32^{m} 39.23^{s}	−27° 49′ 15.66″	30	4.477 ± 0.644
307	Galaxy	03^{h} 32^{m} 39.624^{s}	−27° 49′ 15.59″	29	3.83 ± 0.662
322	Galaxy	03^{h} 32^{m} 41.1854^{s}	−27° 49′ 14.838″	32	5.7
323	Galaxy	03^{h} 32^{m} 41.23^{s}	−27° 49′ 15.1″	30	2.7
324	Galaxy	03^{h} 32^{m} 38.3536^{s}	−27° 49′ 13.237″	27	3.71
328	Galaxy	03^{h} 32^{m} 34.52^{s}	−27° 49′ 48.5″	19	0.21499
341	Galaxy	03^{h} 32^{m} 40.0497^{s}	−27° 49′ 12.675″	27	2.67
344	Galaxy	03^{h} 32^{m} 37.573^{s}	−27° 49′ 11.493″	27	1.3
345	Galaxy	03^{h} 32^{m} 40.9605^{s}	−27° 49′ 12.872″	27	0.88
347	Galaxy	03^{h} 32^{m} 41.30424^{s}	−27° 49′ 12.3132″	27	1.56
348	Galaxy	03^{h} 32^{m} 40.733^{s}	−27° 49′ 13.16″	28	3.541 ± 0.534
355	Galaxy	03^{h} 32^{m} 38.81645^{s}	−27° 49′ 09.21″	24	0.6693
357	Galaxy	03^{h} 32^{m} 41.50171^{s}	−27° 49′ 11.2908″	25	2.66 ± 0.36
359	Galaxy	03^{h} 32^{m} 39.9014^{s}	−27° 49′ 11.4″	27	3.45 ± 0.44
366	Star	03^{h} 32^{m} 42.07392^{s}	−27° 49′ 11.6148″	28	~
367	Galaxy	03^{h} 32^{m} 36.2965^{s}	−27° 49′ 11.114″	26	1.33
372	Galaxy	03^{h} 32^{m} 40.854^{s}	−27° 49′ 11.83″	28	3.699 ± 0.553
383	Galaxy	03^{h} 32^{m} 42.1424^{s}	−27° 49′ 10.217″	27	1.15
384	Galaxy	03^{h} 32^{m} 38.351^{s}	−27° 49′ 12.01″	32	4.753 ± 0.677
388	Galaxy	03^{h} 32^{m} 41.4158^{s}	−27° 49′ 10.78″	27	2.63 ± 0.36
396	Galaxy	03^{h} 32^{m} 42.107^{s}	−27° 49′ 10.46″	28	3.545 ± 0.534

== 401-500 ==
UDF number	Object type	Right ascension (J2000)	Declination (J2000)	Apparent magnitude	Redshift
401	Galaxy	03^{h} 32^{m} 38.8696^{s}	−27° 49′ 08.702″	26	4.122 ± 0.602
403	Galaxy	03^{h} 32^{m} 36.3518^{s}	−27° 49′ 09.733″	26	1.2
405	Galaxy	03^{h} 32^{m} 37.3244^{s}	−27° 49′ 10.047″	27	3.05 ± 0.5
407	Galaxy	03^{h} 32^{m} 38.5666^{s}	−27° 49′ 09.06″	26	3.5
409	Galaxy	03^{h} 32^{m} 41.3614^{s}	−27° 49′ 09.578″	27	3.42 ± 0.43
412	Galaxy	03^{h} 32^{m} 38.7946^{s}	−27° 49′ 07.575″	27	4.25
418	Galaxy	03^{h} 32^{m} 38.0591^{s}	−27° 49′ 09.014″	28	3.83
420	Galaxy	03^{h} 32^{m} 38.032^{s}	−27° 49′ 10.08″	29	3.653 ± 0.547
421	Galaxy	03^{h} 32^{m} 37.44^{s}	−27° 49′ 09.8″	30	4.189 ± 0.77
423	Galaxy	03^{h} 32^{m} 39.1627^{s}	−27° 49′ 44.6306″	20	0.4584
424	Galaxy	03^{h} 32^{m} 36.623^{s}	−27° 49′ 06.343″	26	0.93
428	Galaxy	03^{h} 32^{m} 40.0177^{s}	−27° 49′ 06.5744″	25	1.72
430	Galaxy	03^{h} 32^{m} 38.157^{s}	−27° 49′ 10.11″	30	1.199 ± 1.359
443	Galaxy	03^{h} 32^{m} 38.0158^{s}	−27° 49′ 08.39″	30	5.756 ± 0.794
446	Galaxy	03^{h} 32^{m} 39.39514^{s}	−27° 49′ 06.4645″	25	1.05
457	Galaxy	03^{h} 32^{m} 39.0498^{s}	−27° 49′ 08.286″	33	5.8
461	Galaxy	03^{h} 32^{m} 41.23^{s}	−27° 49′ 07.115″	27	1.14
475	Galaxy	03^{h} 32^{m} 38.8548^{s}	−27° 49′ 06.267″	26	1.24
478	Galaxy	03^{h} 32^{m} 41.607^{s}	−27° 49′ 05.71″	28	4.52
481	Galaxy	03^{h} 32^{m} 37.365^{s}	−27° 49′ 07.34″	29	3.539 ± 0.59
482	Galaxy	03^{h} 32^{m} 40.06^{s}	−27° 49′ 07.49″	32	5.886 ± 0.81
