= United Democratic Forces (disambiguation) =

United Democratic Forces may refer to:

- United Democratic Forces of Belarus
- United Democratic Forces (Benin)
- United Democratic Forces (Bulgaria)
- United Democratic Forces (Congo)
- United Democratic Forces of Rwanda

== See also ==
- Union of Democratic Forces (disambiguation)
- United Democratic Front (disambiguation)
