= HUDF-JD2 =

Galaxy in the constellation Fornax

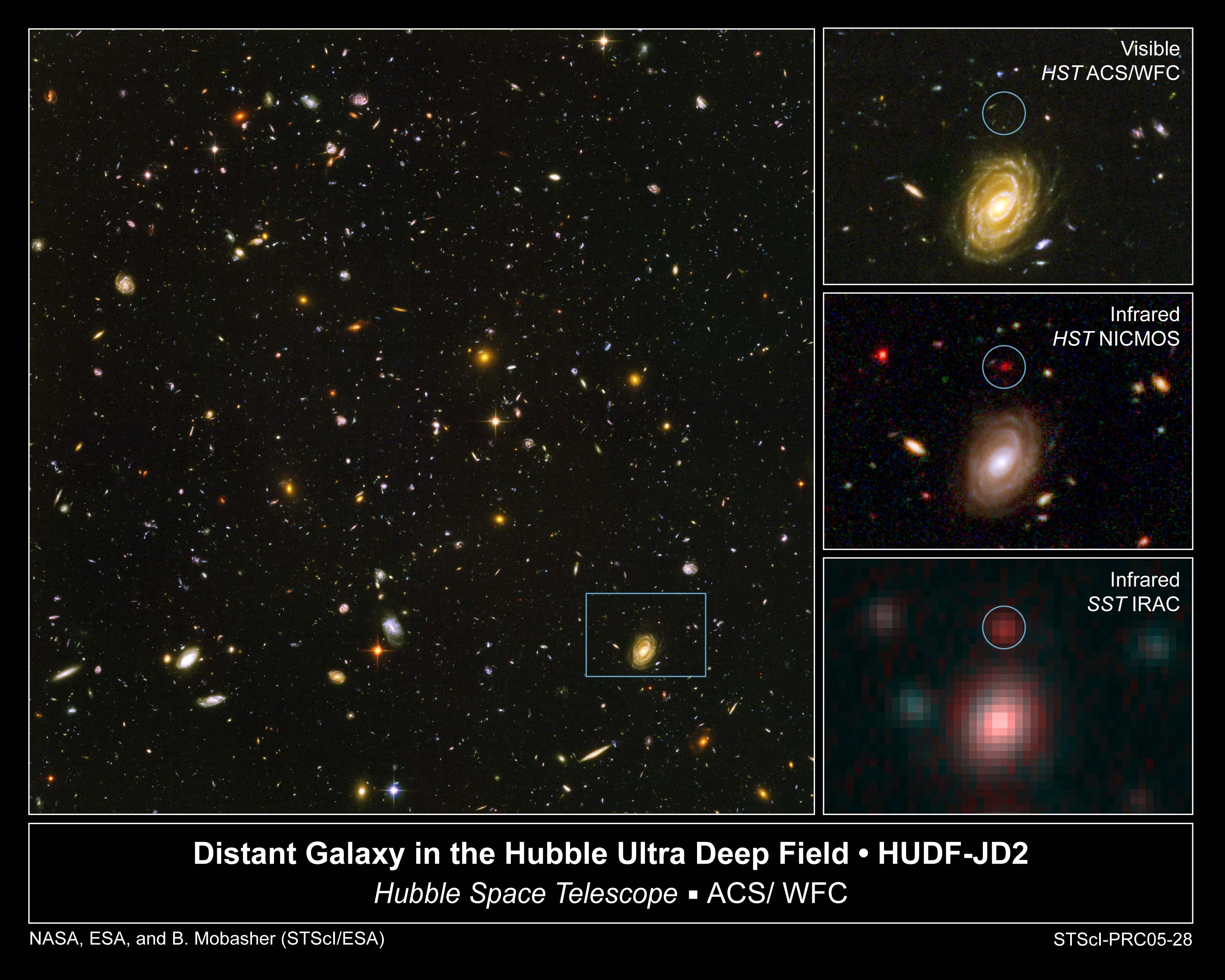

Observation data (J2000 epoch)
- Constellation: Fornax
- Right ascension: 03^{h} 32^{m} 38.7^{s}
- Declination: −27° 48′ 40″
- Redshift: 6.5
- Distance: 12.8 billion ly (4.0 billion pc) (light travel distance); 28.1 billion ly (8.6 billion pc) (proper distance)
- Apparent magnitude (V): 28.1

Characteristics
- Type: E/S0
- Mass: 6×10^{11} M_{☉}

Other designations
- BBG 3179

HUDF-JD2 (UDF 033238.7 -274839.8 or BBG 3179) is a distant, massive, post-starburst galaxy that was discovered with the Hubble Ultra Deep Field (HUDF) image. It was the most distant galaxy identified in the HUDF, in 2005. It is located at 03^{h} 32^{m} 38.7268^{s} −27° 48′ 39.885″ in the constellation of Fornax.

In a 2005 search for very red galaxies in the HUDF that were not detected at wavelengths shorter than the near-infrared J band, two objects were detected. The second, initially designated UDF033238.7-274839.8, displayed a high redshift and showed characteristics of a post-starburst galaxy. The derived photometric redshift yielded z approximately equal to 6.5, which indicates it is most likely being viewed from a time when the Universe was only 830 million years old. The estimated bolometric luminosity of this galaxy is a trillion times the solar luminosity (the luminosity of the Sun) and it has a mass of approximately 600 billion solar masses.

The spectrum of this object indicates that most of its energy is being emitted by stars with three solar masses or less. Hence, as larger stars will exist for shorter periods, this galaxy has an age of more than 300 million years. The period of initial active star formation in this galaxy may have lasted less than 100 million years, during which the galaxy likely participated in the reionization event.

The unusually high mass estimate for this object may be explained by other factors. If it has an active galactic nucleus, this may reduce the mass estimate to half the current value. The estimate could also be affected by gravitational lensing, although it is too far away from the nearest visible object that could produce that effect: a foreground spiral galaxy located 7.3″ distant.

== See also ==
- List of the most distant astronomical objects
