= Turkmen Union of Democratic Forces =

Political party in Turkmenistan

Turkmen Union of Democratic Forces is a Turkmen political party that organized in Vienna, Austria on 23 November 2003 (the original agreement was reached on 29 September). Former foreign minister Awdy Kulyýew, former ambassador to Turkey Nurmuhammet Hanamow, former central bank chief Hudaýberdi Orazow and former deputy agriculture minister Saparmyrat Yklymow are founding members.

Turkmenbashi Saparmurat Niyazov, commenting on the formation of the party, said on television, "It's a pity that many states that pretend to be democratic give them the floor. But shouldn't these states extradite criminals and terrorists?" He described the TUDF as "cowards and traitors who stole that much money that it did not fit their pockets. All of them are thieves, terrorists and fugitives, but if they are not guilty, we will not persecute them. Let them face the court here and then open their parties in Turkmenistan."
