= List of deep fields =

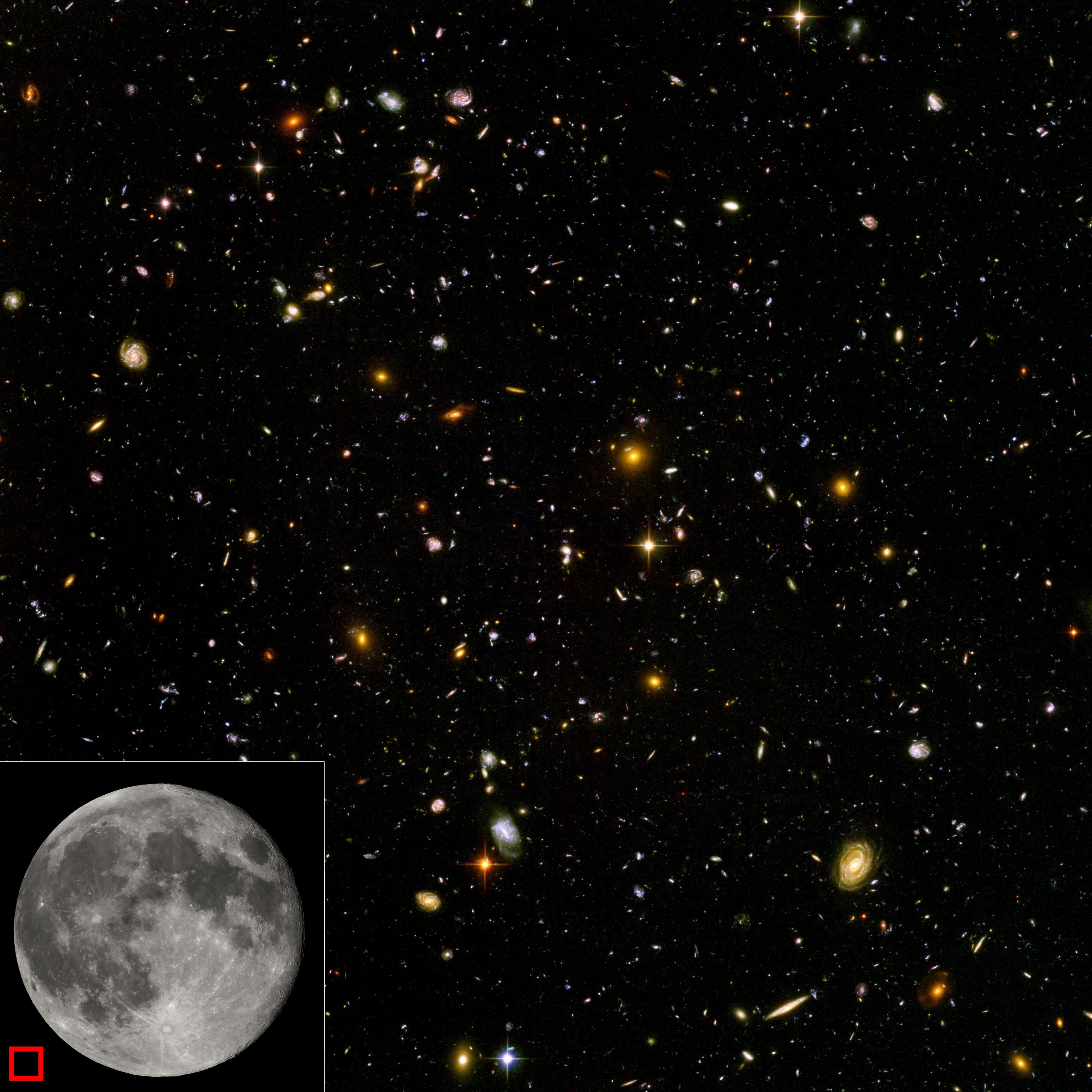
Hubble Ultra-Deep Field image of a region of the observable universe (equivalent sky area size shown in bottom left corner), near the constellation Fornax. Each spot is a galaxy, consisting of billions of stars. The light from the smallest, most redshifted galaxies originated around 12.6 billion years ago, close to the age of the universe.

In astronomy, a deep field is an image of a portion of the sky taken with a very long exposure time, in order to detect and study faint objects. The depth of the field refers to the apparent magnitude or the flux of the faintest objects that can be detected in the image. Deep field observations usually cover a small angular area on the sky, because of the large amounts of telescope time required to reach faint flux limits. Deep fields are used primarily to study galaxy evolution and the cosmic evolution of active galactic nuclei, and to detect faint objects at high redshift. Numerous ground-based and space-based observatories have taken deep-field observations at wavelengths spanning radio to X-rays.

The first deep-field image to receive a great deal of public attention was the Hubble Deep Field, observed in 1995 with the WFPC2 camera on the Hubble Space Telescope. Other space telescopes that have obtained deep-field observations include the Chandra X-ray Observatory, the XMM-Newton Observatory, the Spitzer Space Telescope, and the James Webb Space Telescope.

== Table ==
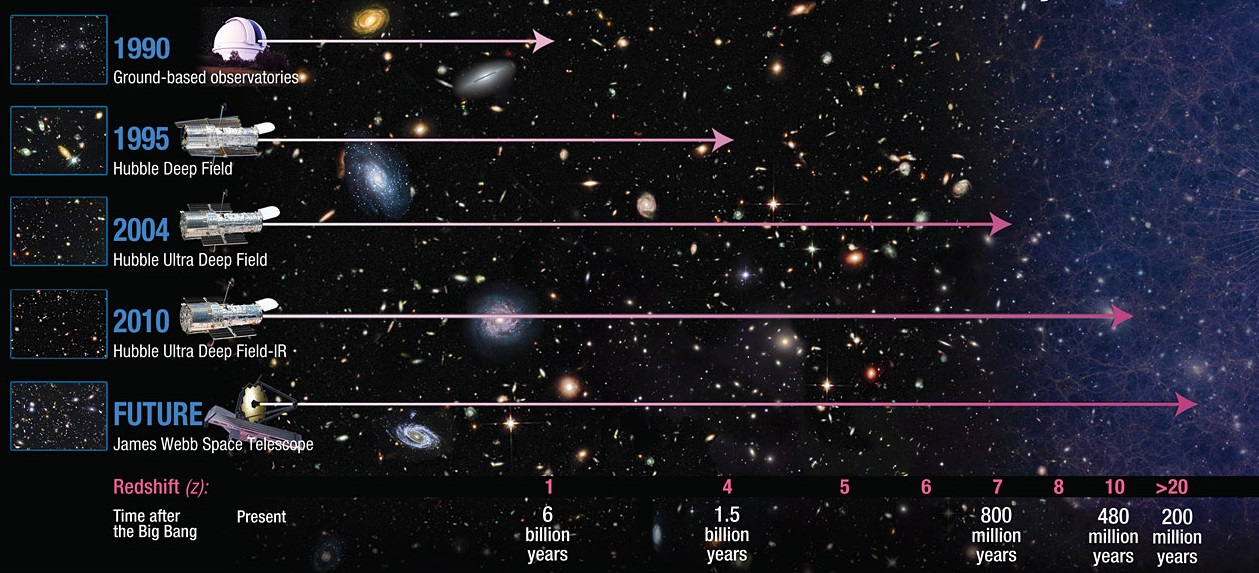
Comparison of how far in the past some of the Hubble Space Telescope's deep fields have seen in terms of redshift and million years and also how far the James Webb Space Telescope should be able to see.

Left: image taken by Hubble (2017) vs Right: the image taken by Webb (2022)
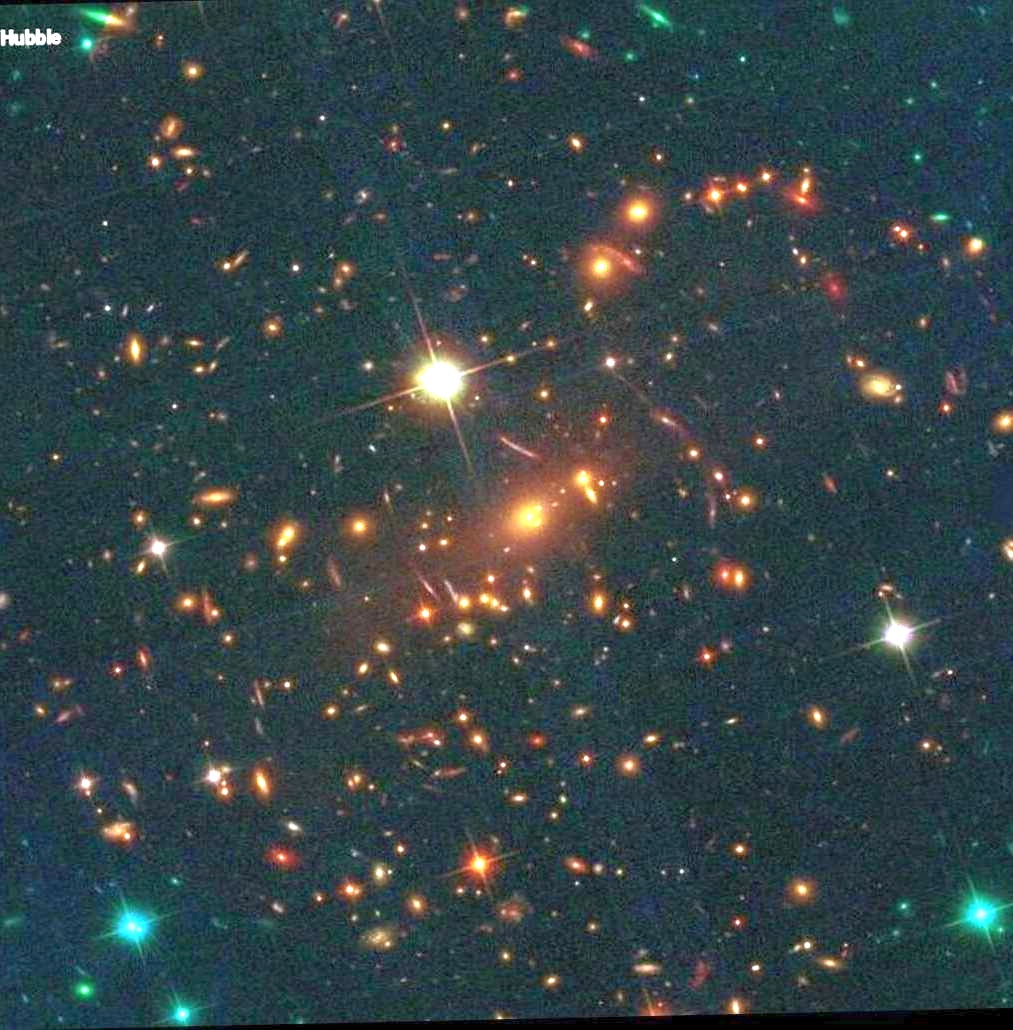
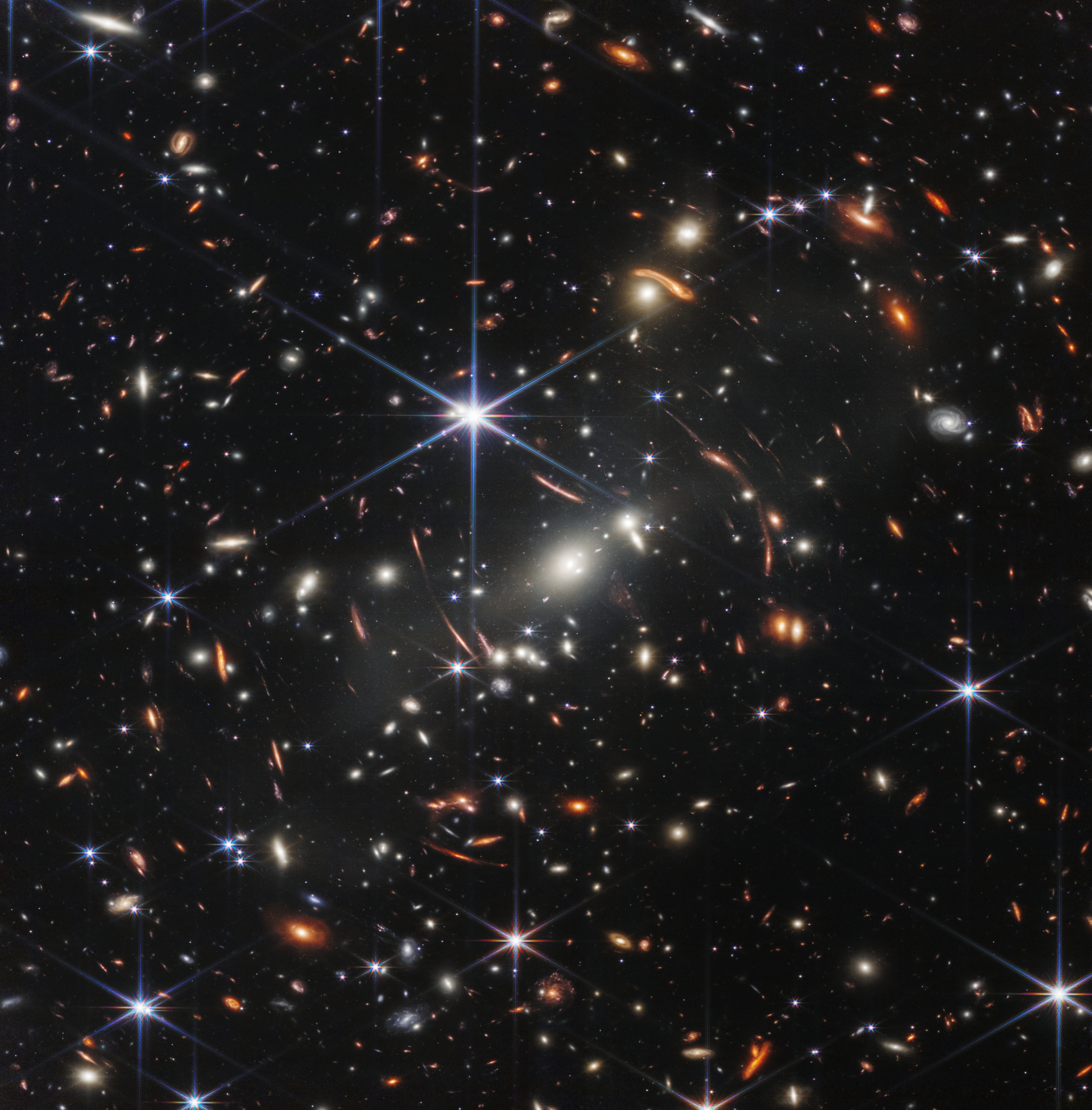
Deep Field – Galaxy cluster SMACS J0723.3-7327

The following table gives a partial list of deep-field observations taken since 1995.

Image	Name	Telescope	Year captured	Size (arcminute)	Number of exposures
	Hubble Deep Field	Hubble Space Telescope	1995	2.6′x2.6′	342
	Hubble Deep Field South	Hubble Space Telescope	1998	5.3²′	995
	Chandra Deep Field South	Chandra X-ray Observatory	1999–2000	16′ across	11
	Hubble Ultra-Deep Field	Hubble Space Telescope	2003–2004	2.4′x2.4′	808
	Extended Groth Strip	Hubble Space Telescope	2004–2005	70′x10′	over 500
	Cosmic Assembly Near-infrared Deep Extragalactic Legacy Survey (CANDELS)	Hubble Space Telescope	2011		
	ESO's VLT and the SINFONI instrument	Very Large Telescope	2012		
	Hubble eXtreme Deep Field	Hubble Space Telescope	2012	2.3′x3′	
	Hubble Ultra-Deep Field (UV/VIS/NIR)	Hubble Space Telescope	2014		
	Hubble Frontier Fields MACS J0416.1-2403	Hubble Space Telescope	2015		
	Hubble Frontier Fields Abell 2744	Hubble Space Telescope	2015		
	Hubble Frontier Fields MACS J0717.5+3745	Hubble Space Telescope	2015		
	Hubble Frontier Fields MACS J1149.5+2223	Hubble Space Telescope	2015		
	Hubble Frontier Fields Abell S1063	Hubble Space Telescope	2016		
	Hubble Frontier Fields Abell 370	Hubble Space Telescope	2017		
	Hubble Frontier Fields Abell 370 parallel field	Hubble Space Telescope	2017		
	Hubble Deep UV (HDUV) Legacy Survey	Hubble Space Telescope	2018		
	Hubble Legacy Field	Hubble Space Telescope	2019	25′x25′	7,500
	Dark Energy Survey	Víctor M. Blanco Telescope	2021	18.41′x9.64′	
	Webb's First Deep Field	James Webb Space Telescope	2022	2.4′ across	
	James Webb Space Telescope – JADES (James Webb Space Telescope Advanced Deep Extragalactic Survey); First Deep Field	James Webb Space Telescope	2022	4-6′×12′ approx; (4′×6′ and 6′×6′ subsets adjacent)	
	James Webb Space Telescope – JADES (James Webb Space Telescope Advanced Deep Extragalactic Survey)	James Webb Space Telescope	2024	6′x4′	
	Euclid Deep Field North (EDF-N)	Euclid	2025-(data release 3)	20 deg^{2}	DR3 visits: 40
	Euclid Deep Field South (EDF-S)	Euclid	2025-(data release 3)	23 deg^{2}	DR3 visits: 45
	Euclid Deep Field Fornax (EDF-F), centred on Chandra Deep Field South	Euclid	2025-(data release 3)	10 deg^{2}	DR3 visits: 52

== See also ==
- List of Hubble Space Telescope anniversary images
