= Uniqueness Database File =

In Microsoft Windows system administration, a Uniqueness Database File (UDF) is a text file utilized by administrators to supply unique information specific to each computer or user. This functionality is particularly important when deploying operating systems like Windows XP Professional to multiple client computers that require varied setup configurations.

== Purpose and Functionality ==
The primary purpose of a UDF is to automate and streamline the deployment process of Windows operating systems by allowing administrators to specify unique parameters for each target computer or user. This is achieved by pairing the UDF with a single answer file, typically named unattend.txt or sysprep.inf. The answer file contains the general settings for the deployment, while the UDF overrides these settings with unique values where necessary.

== Deployment Process ==
When deploying Windows XP Professional across multiple computers, the deployment tool reads the answer file to apply the standard configuration settings. Simultaneously, it references the UDF to insert unique values such as computer names, IP addresses, and user-specific settings. This dual-file approach ensures consistency in deployment while catering to individual customization needs.

1. Preparation: The administrator prepares the UDF, listing unique settings for each computer. These settings might include:
  - Computer name
  - User account information
  - Network configuration
  - Regional settings
2. Integration: The UDF is placed in the same directory as the answer file. During the setup, the deployment process reads the answer file first and then applies the unique values from the UDF.
3. Execution: The deployment tool processes both files, ensuring that each computer receives the appropriate unique settings without manual intervention for each installation.

== Example of a UDF ==
[UniqueIDs]
PC001=UserData
PC002=UserData

[PC001:UserData]
ComputerName=COMPUTER1
FullName="John Doe"
OrgName="Example Corp"
ProductKey=XXXXX-XXXXX-XXXXX-XXXXX-XXXXX

[PC002:UserData]
ComputerName=COMPUTER2
FullName="Jane Smith"
OrgName="Example Corp"
ProductKey=XXXXX-XXXXX-XXXXX-XXXXX-XXXXX
    

In this example, PC001 and PC002 represent unique identifiers for two computers. The sections [PC001:UserData] and [PC002:UserData] provide specific settings for each machine.

== Benefits ==
- Efficiency: Simplifies the mass deployment of Windows XP by reducing the need for manual configuration.
- Consistency: Ensures that common settings are uniformly applied while allowing for necessary customizations.
- Scalability: Facilitates the deployment of large numbers of computers with minimal effort.
