= United Democratic Front (Mizoram) =

United Democratic Front is a front of eight political parties (Mizo National Front, Mizoram People's Conference, Zoram Nationalist Party, Maraland Democratic Front, Hmar People's Convention, Paite Tribes Council, Bharatiya Janata Party, and Nationalist Congress Party) in the Indian state of Mizoram. The front fielded Robert Romawia Royte for Mizoram's lone Lok Sabha constituency in the 2014 Indian general election. Founded in March 2014, it supports the National Democratic Alliance (NDA). It was agreed that, if Royte wins the election, he would support the NDA in the Lok Sabha. Royte lost the election to Indian National Congress' C. L. Ruala by a margin of 11,361 votes.
