= United Democratic Front (South Sudan) =

Political party in South Sudan

United Democratic Front جبهة الديمقراطية المتحدة
- Leader: Peter A. Sule
- Founded: 2002
- Headquarters: Juba
- Ideology: Liberalism
- Colours: Rainbow colours
- National Legislative Assembly: 0 / 550

The United Democratic Front (Juba Arabic: جبهة الديمقراطية المتحدة Jabhet Al-Dimoqratiyet Al-Mutahedat) is a political party in South Sudan. It is led by Peter Abdurahman Sule. The party was previously represented in the Interim National Assembly of Sudan and the South Sudan Legislative Assembly, where it held four seats.

The United Democratic Front (UDF) party was founded in 2002 by Peter Abdulrahman Sule. It was previously the main opposition party in the country since the Republic of South Sudan achieved its independence in 2011.

In 2011, the SPLM government arrested Sule. He remained in detention for two years without trial. In October 2013, he was released through a presidential amnesty issued by Salva Kiir the president of the Republic of South Sudan. After conflict erupted in December 2013, an accord known as the Agreement on the Resolution of the Conflict in the Republic of South Sudan (ARCSS) was signed in 2015 between SPLM-IO, GRSS, Former Detainees (FDs) and other political parties. This agreement did not hold long and the country returned to war again in July 2016

During the negotiations of 2014–2015, the UDF party submitted through email to the IGAD special envoy its position on how the conflict in the country could be resolved. The government responded by confiscating the passport of the party's chairman. He was not allowed to travel to Addis Ababa to attend peace negotiations.

In February 2014, Sule appointed Bona Deng Lawrence as his deputy and dismissed Sebastian Uchan Kiech from his position as deputy chairman.

On 31 December 2014, Sule fled to Uganda, seeking political asylum, which was granted to him and his family members.

In July 2015, news of his reported assassination was covered in the media. UDF, under the leadership of Lawrence, participated in the 2018 peace negotiations in both Addis Ababa, Ethiopia, and Khartoum, Sudan. These negotiations resulted in the signing of the Revitalized Agreement on the Resolution of the Conflict in the Republic of South Sudan (R-ARCSS) in September 2018.

== Notable people ==
- Duoth Koang Rueh Wour, South Sudanese politician
