= Hubble Ultra-Deep Field =

Deep-field space image in Fornax

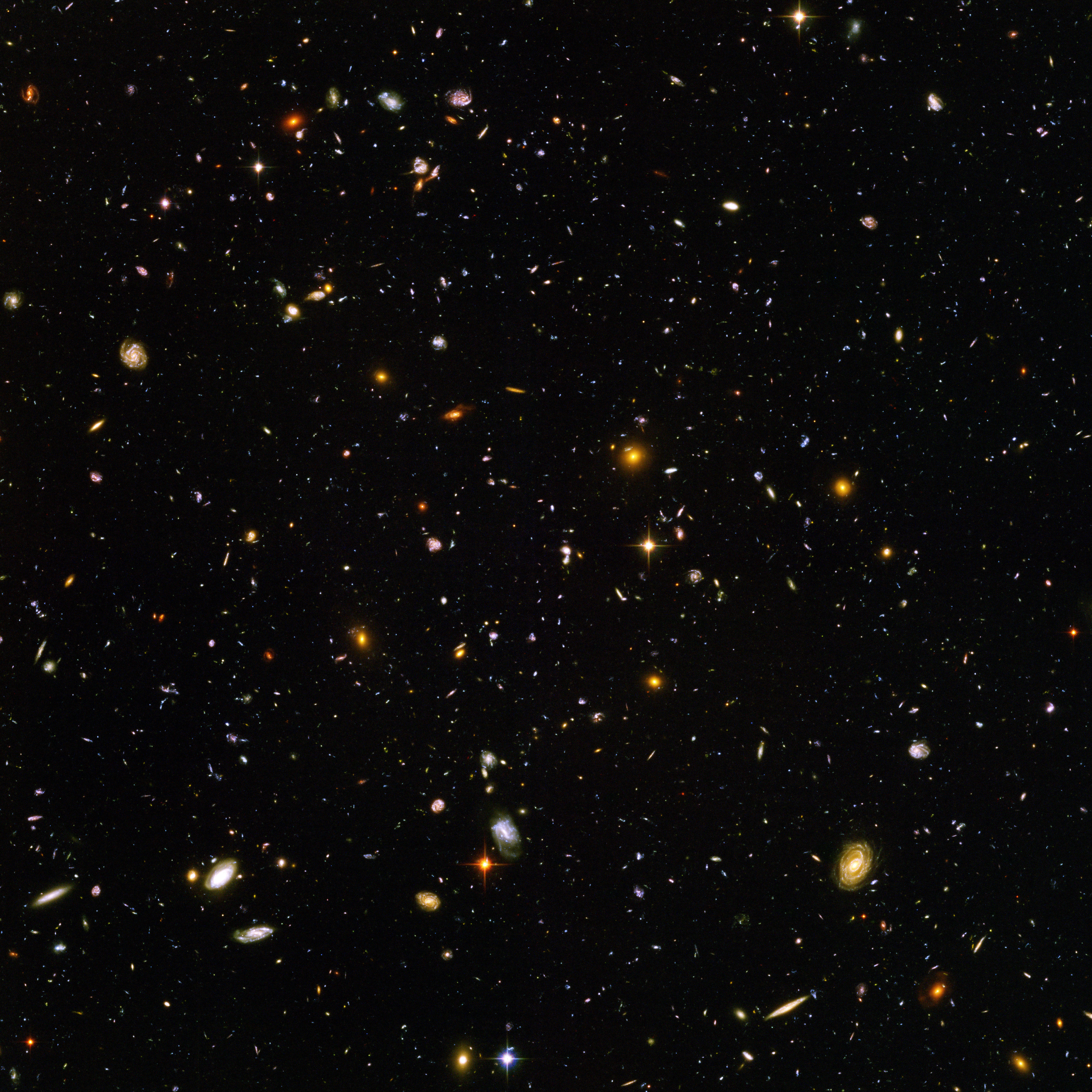
The original NASA release, containing about 10,000 galaxies of various ages, sizes, shapes, and colors. The smallest, reddest ones are some of the most distant galaxies to have been imaged by an optical telescope, probably existing shortly after the Big Bang.

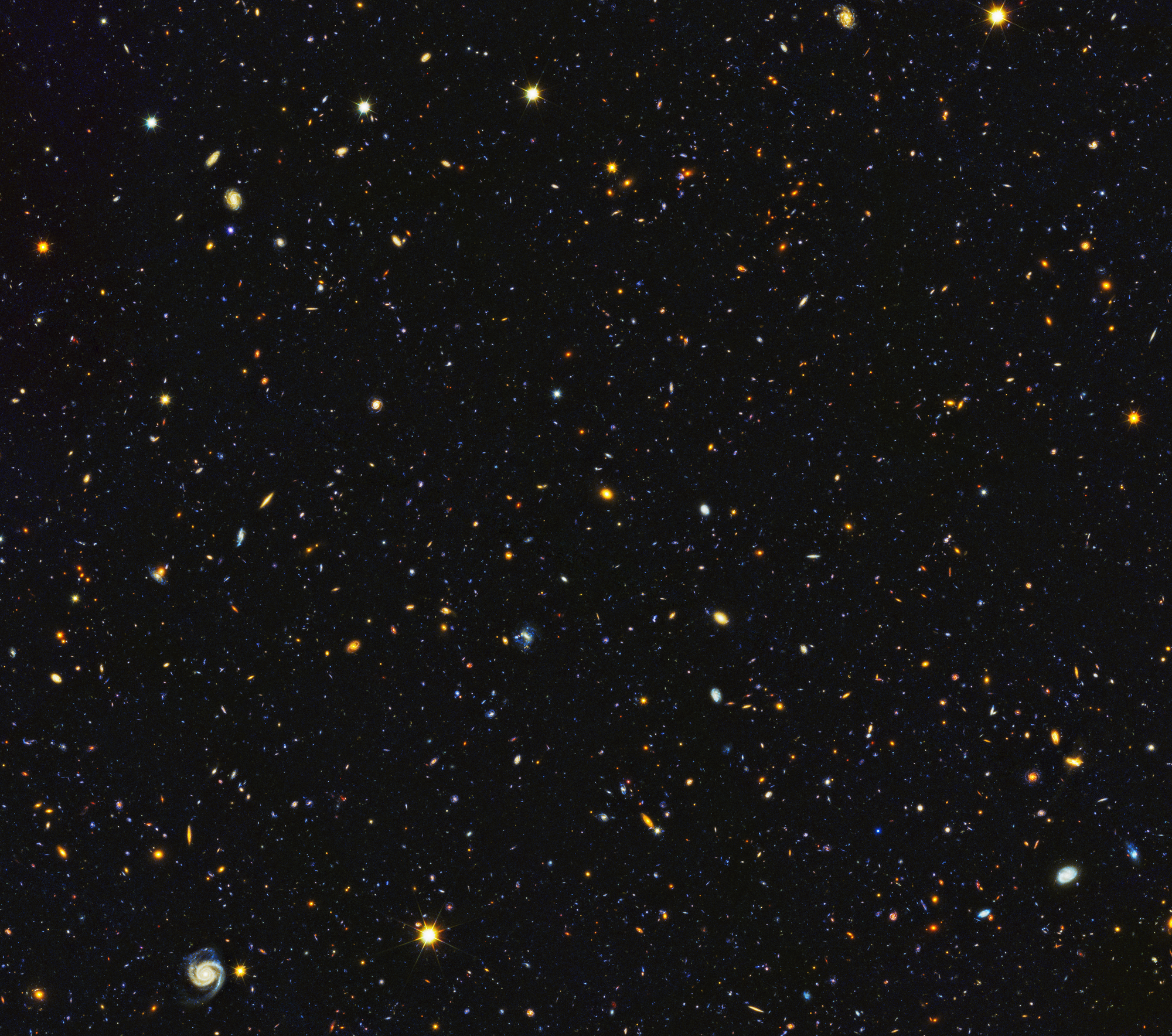
Hubble Deep UV (HDUV) Legacy Survey; 15k galaxies, released August 16, 2018

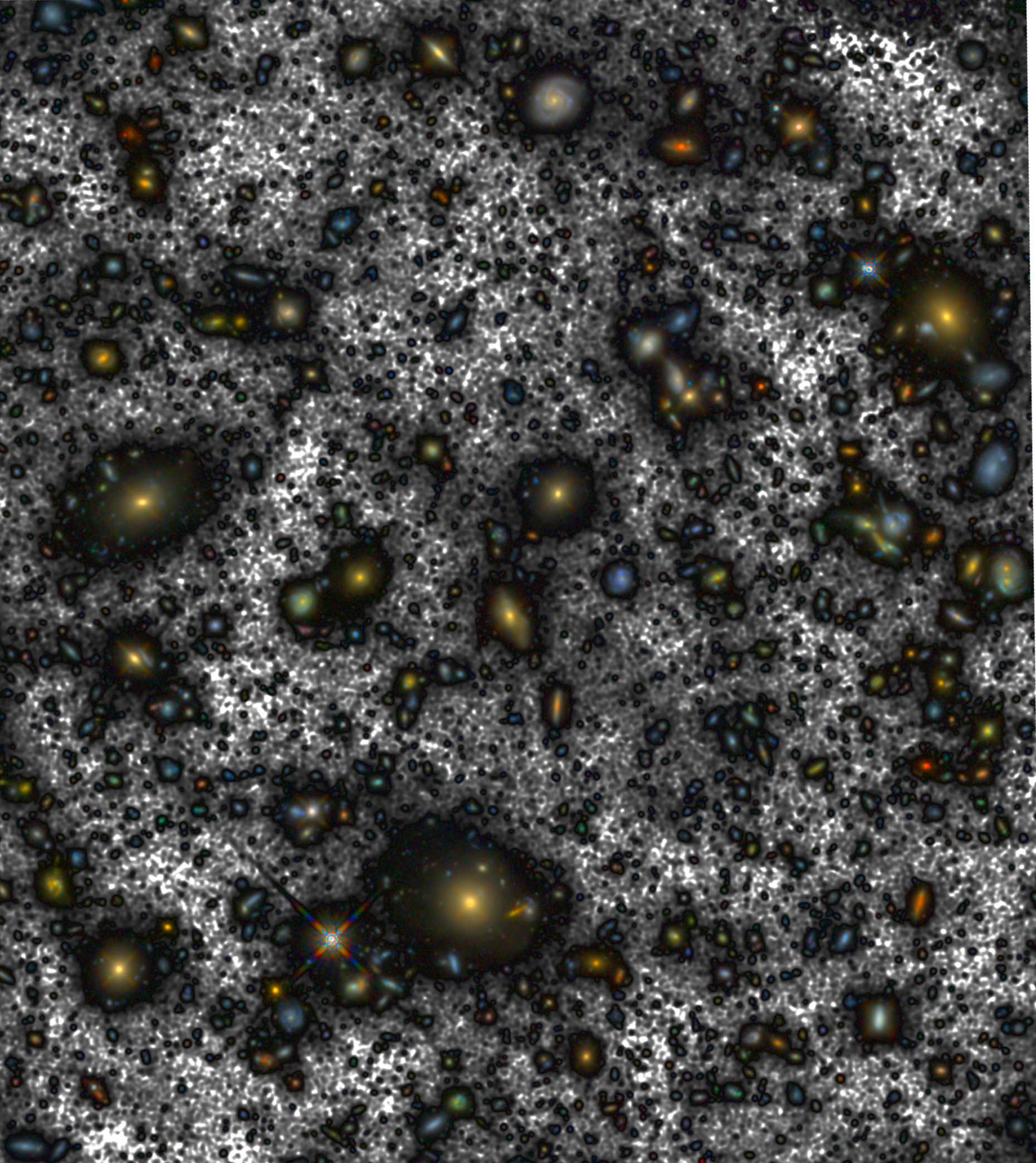
ABYSS WFC3/IR Hubble Ultra Deep Field; released January 24, 2019

The Hubble Ultra-Deep Field (HUDF) is a deep-field image of a small region of space in the constellation Fornax, containing an estimated 10,000 galaxies. The original data for the image was collected by the Hubble Space Telescope from September 2003 to January 2004 and the first version of the image was released on March 9, 2004. It includes light from galaxies that existed about 13 billion years ago, some 400 to 800 million years after the Big Bang.

The HUDF image was taken in a section of the sky with a low density of bright stars in the near-field, allowing much better viewing of dimmer, more distant objects. Located southwest of Orion in the southern-hemisphere constellation Fornax, the rectangular image is 2.4 arcminutes to an edge, or 3.4 arcminutes diagonally. This is about one-tenth of the angular diameter of a full moon viewed from Earth (less than 34 arcminutes), smaller than a 1 mm^{2} piece of paper held 1 m away, and equal to roughly one twenty-six-millionth of the total area of the sky. The image is oriented so that the upper left corner points toward north (−46.4°) on the celestial sphere.

In August and September 2009, the HUDF field was observed at longer wavelengths (1.0 to 1.6 μm) using the infrared channel of the recently fitted Wide Field Camera 3 (WFC3). This additional data enabled astronomers to identify a new list of potentially very distant galaxies.

On September 25, 2012, NASA released a new version of the Ultra-Deep Field dubbed the eXtreme Deep Field (XDF). The XDF reveals galaxies from 13.2 billion years ago, including one thought to have formed only 450 million years after the Big Bang.

On June 3, 2014, NASA released the Hubble Ultra Deep Field 2014 image, the first HUDF image to use the full range of ultraviolet to near-infrared light. A composite of separate exposures taken in 2002 to 2012 with Hubble's Advanced Camera for Surveys and Wide Field Camera 3, it shows some 10,000 galaxies.

On January 23, 2019, the Instituto de Astrofísica de Canarias released an even deeper version of the infrared images of the Hubble Ultra Deep Field obtained with the WFC3 instrument, named the ABYSS Hubble Ultra Deep Field. The new images improve the previous reduction of the WFC3/IR images, including careful sky background subtraction around the largest galaxies on the field of view. After this update, some galaxies were found to be almost twice as big as previously measured.

== Planning ==
In the years since the original Hubble Deep Field, the Hubble Deep Field South and the GOODS sample were analyzed, providing increased statistics at the high redshifts probed by the HDF. When the Advanced Camera for Surveys (ACS) detector was installed on the HST, it was realized that an ultra-deep field could observe galaxy formation out to even higher redshifts than had currently been observed, as well as providing more information about galaxy formation at intermediate redshifts (z~2). A workshop on how to best carry out surveys with the ACS was held at STScI in late 2002. At the workshop Massimo Stiavelli advocated an Ultra Deep Field as a way to study the objects responsible for the reionization of the Universe. Following the workshop, the STScI Director Steven Beckwith decided to devote 400 orbits of Director's Discretionary time to the UDF and appointed Stiavelli as the lead of the Home Team implementing the observations.

Unlike the Deep Fields, the HUDF does not lie in Hubble's Continuous Viewing Zone (CVZ). The earlier observations, using the Wide Field and Planetary Camera 2 (WFPC2) camera, were able to take advantage of the increased observing time on these zones by using wavelengths with higher noise to observe at times when earthshine contaminated the observations; however, ACS does not observe at these wavelengths, so the advantage was reduced.

As with the earlier fields, this one was required to contain very little emission from our galaxy, with little zodiacal dust. The field was also required to be in a range of declinations such that it could be observed both by southern hemisphere instruments, such as the Atacama Large Millimeter Array, and northern hemisphere ones, such as those located on Hawaii. It was ultimately decided to observe a section of the Chandra Deep Field South, due to existing deep X-ray observations from Chandra X-ray Observatory and two interesting objects already observed in the GOODS sample at the same location: a redshift 5.8 galaxy and a supernova. The coordinates of the field are right ascension 3^{h} 32^{m} 39.0^{s}, declination −27° 47′ 29.1″ (J2000). The field is 200 arcseconds to a side, with a total area of 11 square arcminutes, and lies in the constellation of Fornax.

== Observations ==
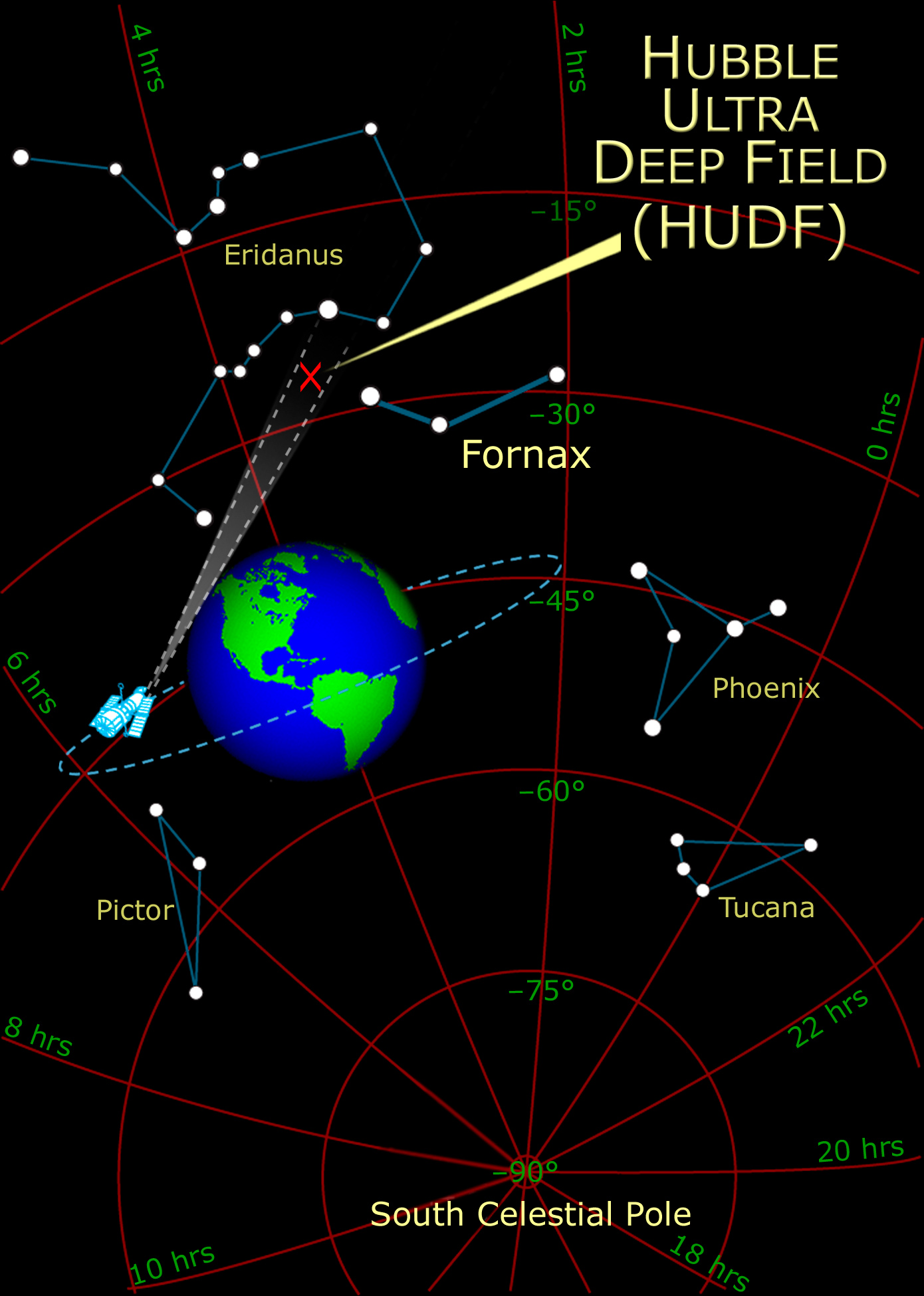
Location of the Hubble Ultra-Deep Field on the sky

Four filters were used on the ACS, centered on 435, 606, 775 and 850 nm, with exposure times set to give equal sensitivity in all filters. These wavelength ranges match those used by the GOODS sample, allowing direct comparison between the two. As with the Deep Fields, the HUDF used Directors Discretionary Time. In order to get the best resolution possible, the observations were dithered by pointing the telescope at slightly different positions for each exposure—a process trialled with the Hubble Deep Field—so that the final image has a higher resolution than the pixels on their own would normally allow.

The observations were done in two sessions, from September 23 to October 28, 2003, and December 4, 2003, to January 15, 2004. The total exposure time is just under 1 million seconds (~11 days), from 400 orbits, with a typical exposure time of 1200 seconds. In total, 800 ACS exposures were taken over the course of 11.3 days, two per orbit; NICMOS observed for 4.5 days. All the individual ACS exposures were processed and combined by Anton Koekemoer into a set of scientifically useful images, each with a total exposure time ranging from 134,900 seconds to 347,100 seconds. To observe the whole sky to the same sensitivity, the HST would need to observe continuously for a million years.

Observations made of the HUDF with ACS.
Camera	Filter	Wavelength	Total exposure time	Exposures
ACS	F435W	435 nm	134,880 s (56 orbits)	112
ACS	F606W	606 nm	135,320 s (56 orbits)	112
ACS	F775W	775 nm	347,110 s (144 orbits)	288
ACS	F850LP	850 nm	346,620 s (144 orbits)	288

The sensitivity of the ACS limits its capability of detecting galaxies at high redshift to about 6. The deep NICMOS fields obtained in parallel to the ACS images could in principle be used to detect galaxies at redshift 7 or higher but they were lacking visible band images of similar depth. These are necessary to identify high redshift objects as they should not be seen in the visible bands. In order to obtain deep visible exposures on top of the NICMOS parallel fields a follow-up program, HUDF05, was approved and granted 204 orbits to observe the two parallel fields (GO-10632). The orientation of the HST was chosen so that further NICMOS parallel images would fall on top of the main UDF field.

After the installation of WFC3 on Hubble in 2009, the HUDF09 programme (GO-11563) devoted 192 orbits to observations of three fields, including HUDF, using the newly available F105W, F125W and F160W infra-red filters (which correspond to the Y, J and H bands):

Observations made of the HUDF with WFC3
Camera	Filter	Wavelength	Exposure time
WFC3	F105W	1050 nm ± 150	16 orbits, 14 usable
WFC3	F125W	1250 nm ± 150	16 orbits
WFC3	F160W	1600 nm ± 150	28 orbits

== Contents ==
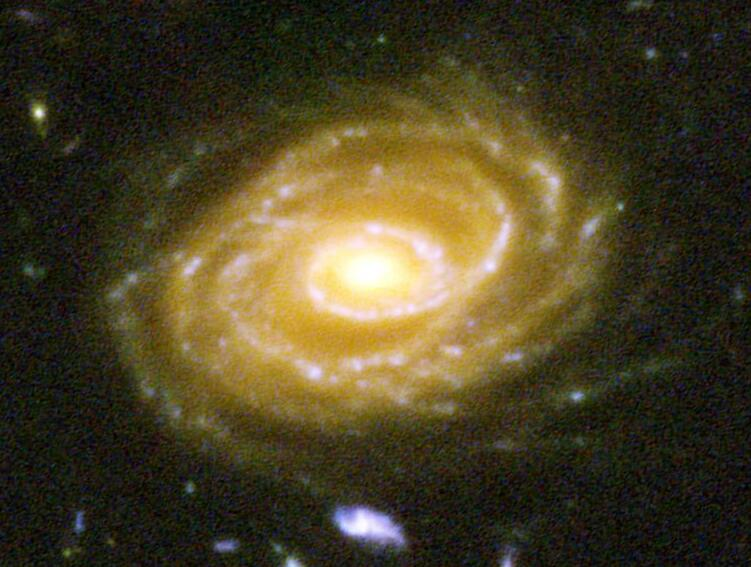
Spiral galaxy UDF 423 (visible-light)

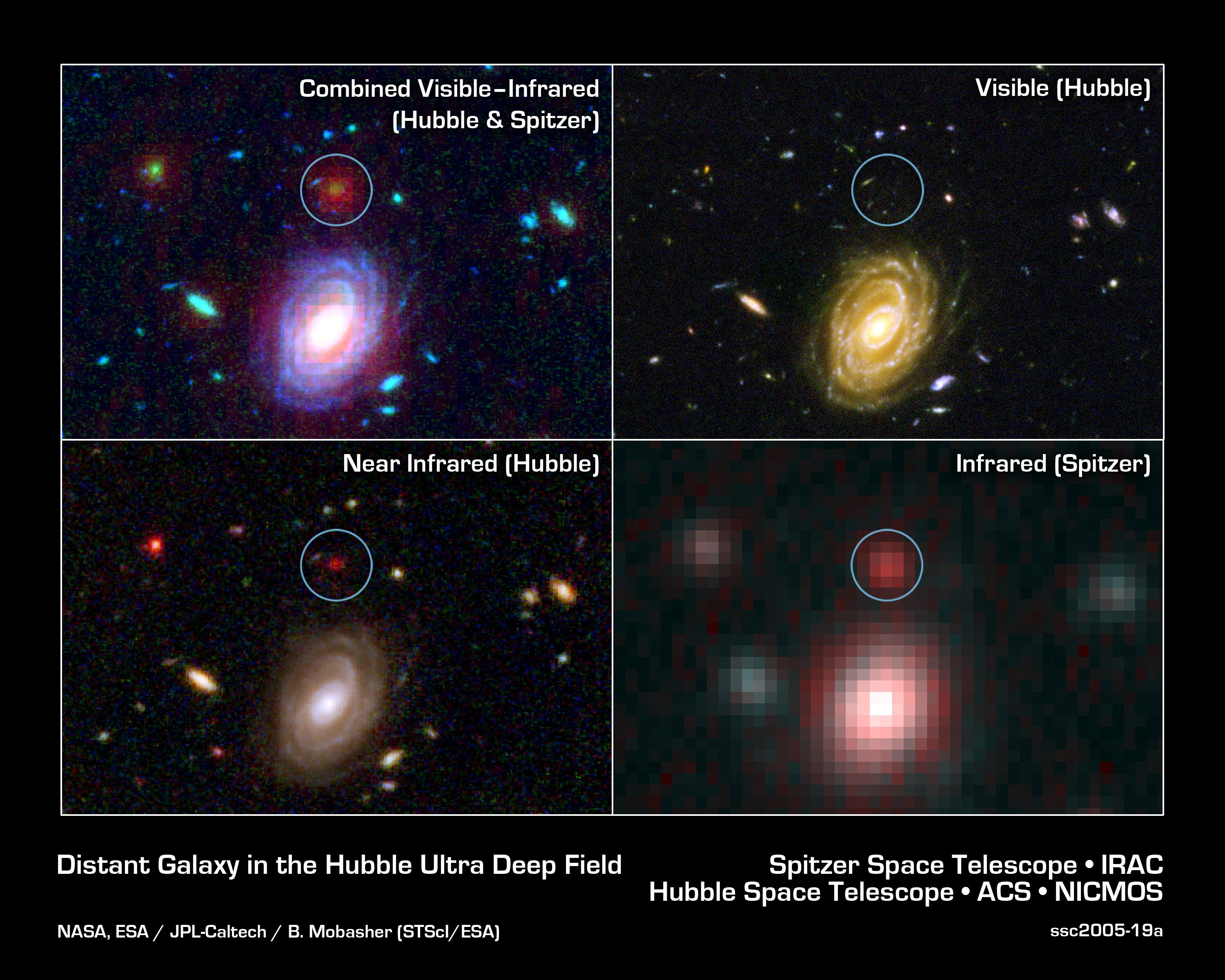
Hidden to visible light, another object above the galaxy

The HUDF was the deepest image of the universe ever taken in 2004 and has been used to search for galaxies that existed less than a billion years after the Big Bang. Several galaxies in the HUDF are candidates, based on photometric redshifts, to be amongst the most distant astronomical objects. The red dwarf UDF 2457 at distance of 59,000 light-years is the furthest star resolved by the HUDF.

The field imaged by the ACS contains over 10,000 objects, the majority of which are galaxies, many at redshifts greater than 3, and some that probably have redshifts between 6 and 7. The NICMOS measurements may have discovered galaxies at redshifts up to 12.

== Scientific results ==
The HUDF has revealed high rates of star formation during the very early stages of galaxy formation, within a billion years after the Big Bang. It has also enabled improved characterization of the distribution of galaxies, their numbers, sizes and luminosities at different epochs, aiding investigation into the evolution of galaxies. Galaxies at high redshifts have been confirmed to be smaller and less symmetrical than ones at lower redshifts, illuminating the rapid evolution of galaxies in the first couple of billion years after the Big Bang.

== Hubble eXtreme Deep Field ==
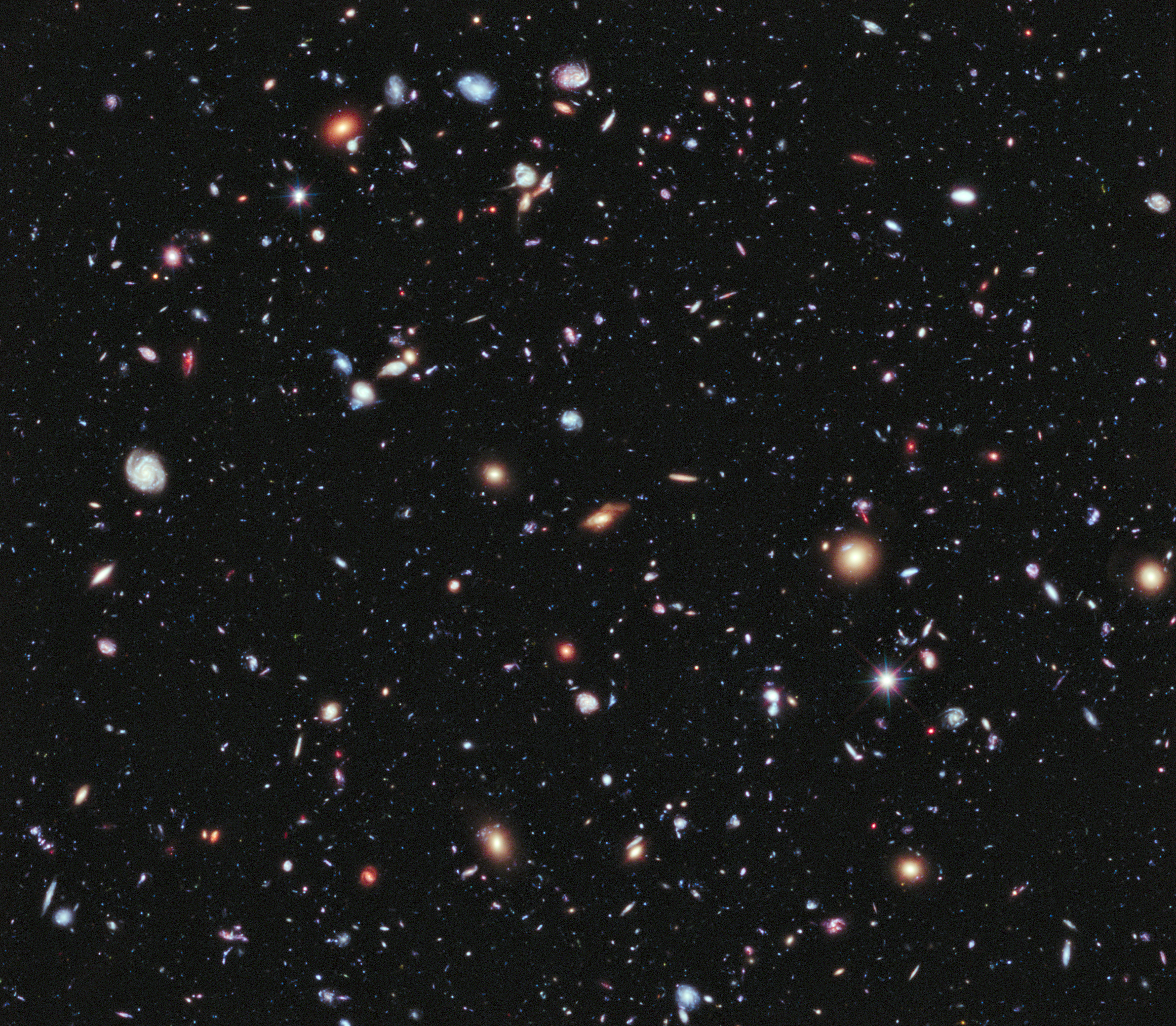
Hubble eXtreme Deep Field (HXDF) taken in 2012

The Hubble eXtreme Deep Field (HXDF), released on September 25, 2012, is an image of a portion of space in the center of the Hubble Ultra Deep Field image. Representing a total of two million seconds (about 23 days) of exposure time collected over 10 years, the image covers an area of 2.3 arcminutes by 2 arcminutes, or about 80% of the area of the HUDF. This represents about one thirty-two millionth of the sky.

The HXDF contains about 5,500 galaxies, the oldest of which are seen as they were 13.2 billion years ago. The faintest galaxies are one ten-billionth the brightness of what the human eye can see. The red galaxies in the image are the remnants of galaxies after major collisions during their elderly years. Many of the smaller galaxies in the image are very young galaxies that eventually developed into major galaxies, similar to the Milky Way and other galaxies in its galactic neighborhood.

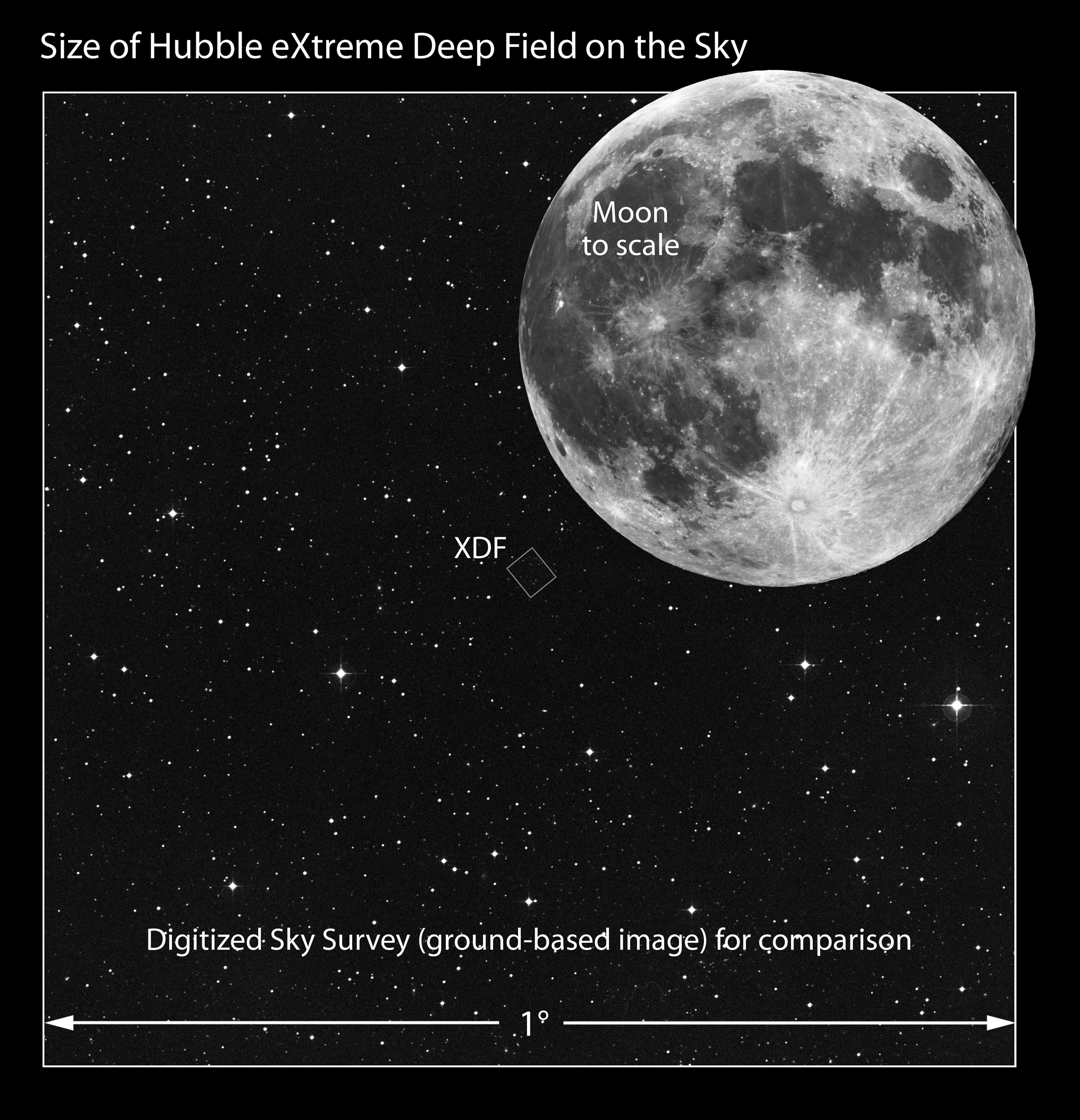
XDF size compared with the size of the Moon

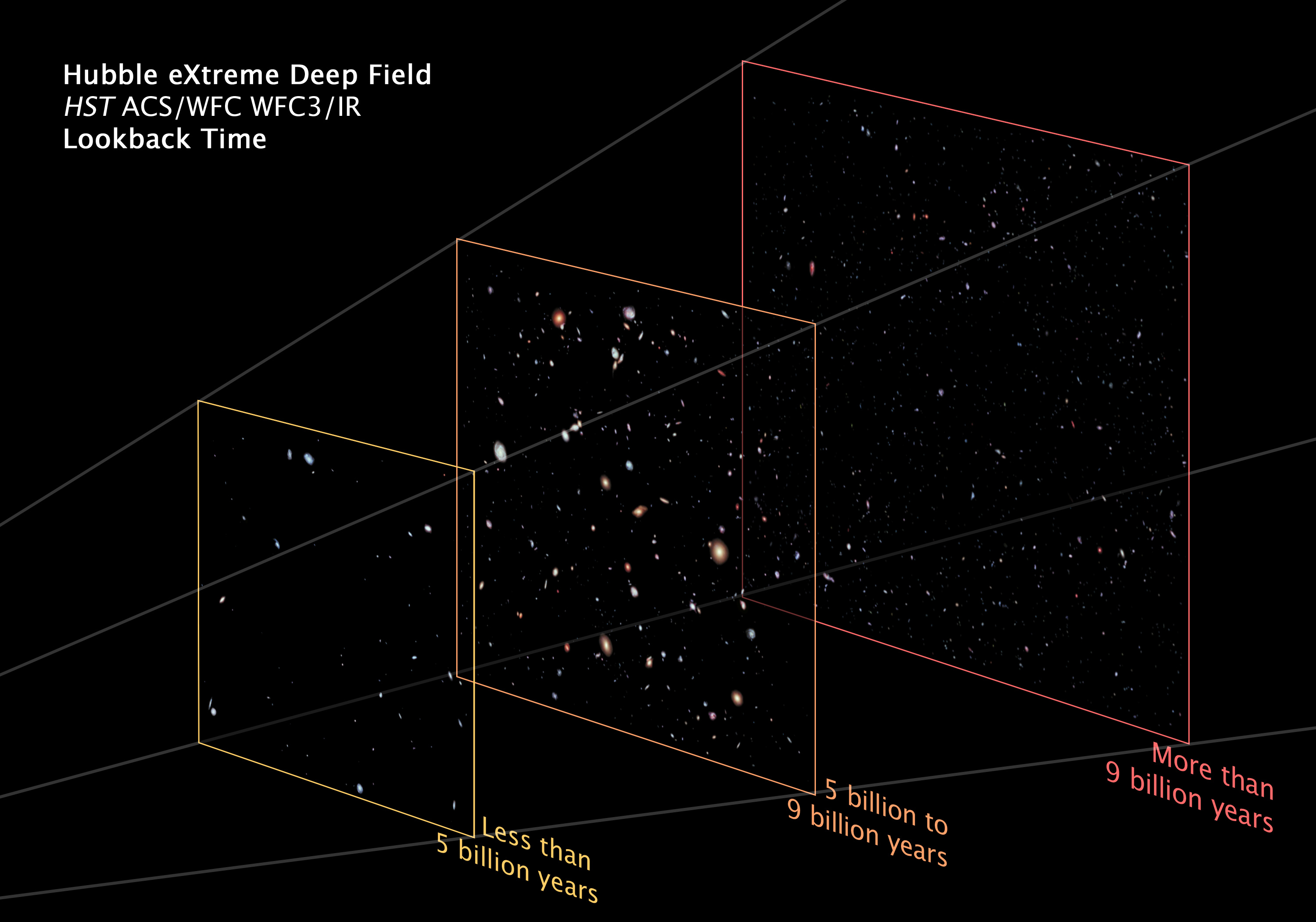
HXDF image shows mature galaxies in the foreground plane, nearly mature galaxies from 5 to 9 billion years ago, and protogalaxies beyond 9 billion years.

Video (02:42) about how the Hubble eXtreme Deep Field image was made.

== See also ==
- List of deep fields
- List of UDF objects (1–500)
- HUDF-JD2
- UDF 2457 (star)
- UDFj-39546284
- UDFy-38135539
