= UDF 423 =

Distant spiral galaxy in the constellation Fornax

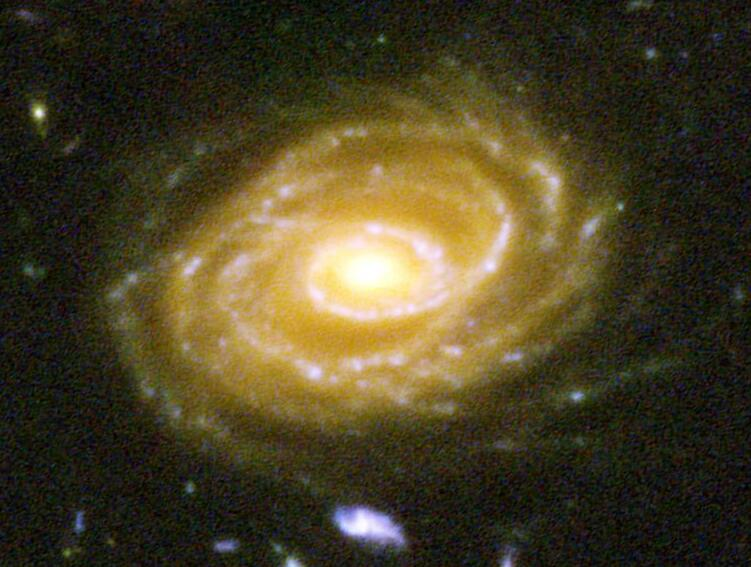
- Spiral galaxy UDF 423 in the Hubble Ultra Deep Field

Observation data (J2000 epoch)
- Constellation: Fornax
- Right ascension: 03^{h} 32^{m} 39.16^{s}
- Declination: −27° 48′ 44.7″
- Redshift: 1 (or 0.46)
- Distance: 7.7 billion light-years (or 4.7 billion light-years) (light travel distance); ~10 billion light-years (or 5.7 billion light-years) (present comoving distance)
- Apparent magnitude (V): 20

Characteristics
- Type: Sab
- Apparent size (V): 0.11' x 5.04" or 0.0027' x 0.0027'

UDF 423 is the Hubble Ultra Deep Field (UDF) identifier for a distant spiral galaxy. With an apparent magnitude of 20, UDF 423 is one of the brightest galaxies in the HUDF and also has one of the largest apparent sizes in the HUDF.

== Distance measurements ==
The "distance" of a far away galaxy depends on how it is measured. With a redshift of 1, light from this galaxy is estimated to have taken around 7.7 billion years to reach Earth. However, since this galaxy is receding from Earth, the present comoving distance is estimated to be around 10 billion light-years away. In context, Hubble is observing this galaxy as it appeared when the Universe was around 5.9 billion years old.

== Image gallery ==
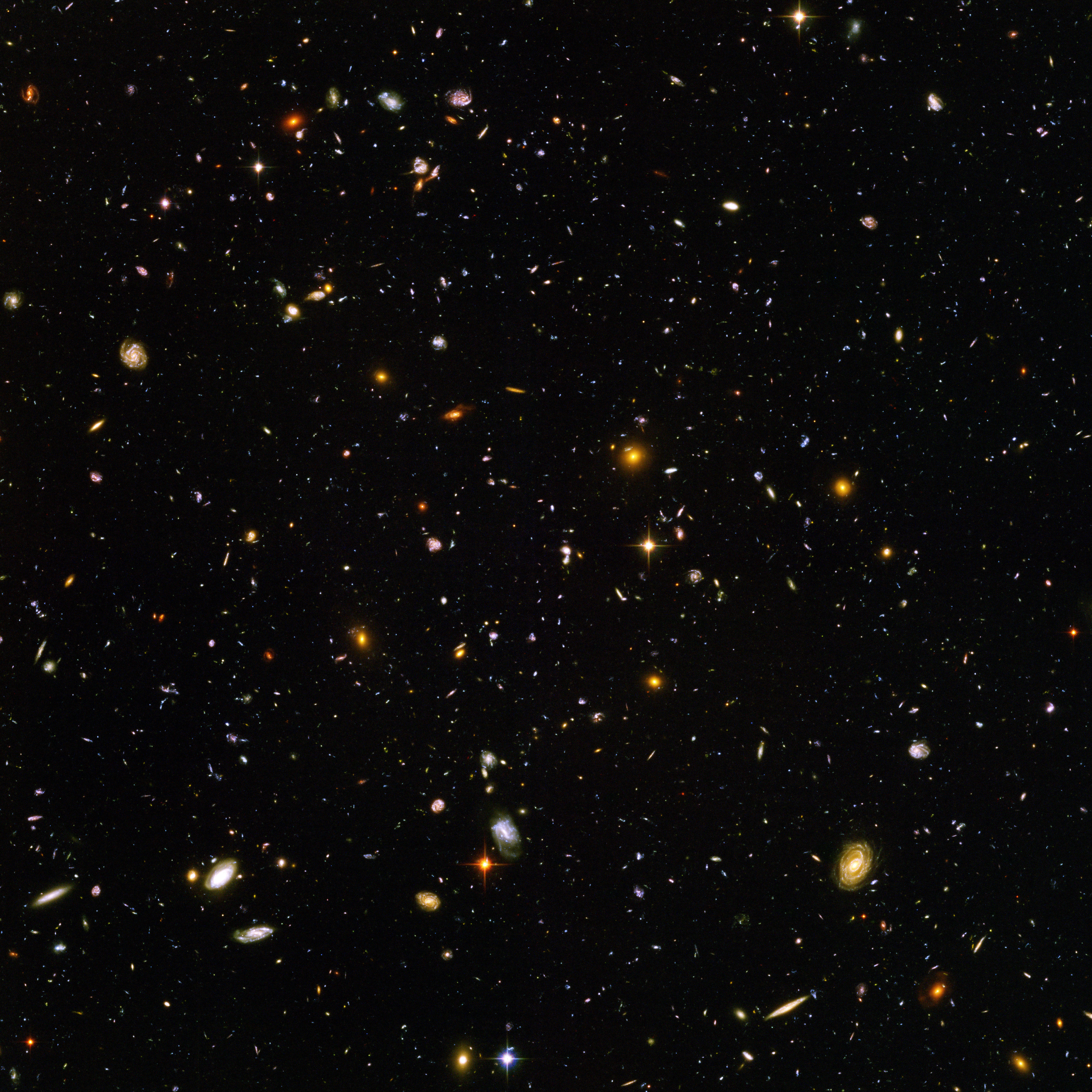
UDF 423 is the spiral galaxy in the lower right quadrant of the Hubble Ultra Deep Field.

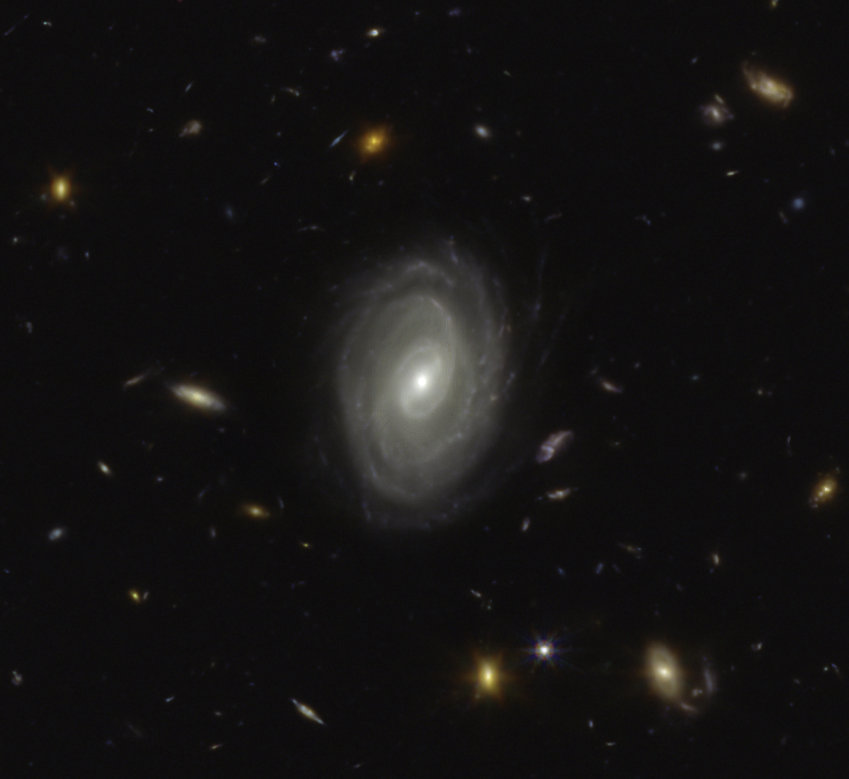
UDF 423 imaged by the James Webb Space Telescope

== See also ==
- List of Deep Fields
