= April–June 2022 in science =

This article lists a number of significant events in science that have occurred in the second quarter of 2022.

== Events ==
=== April ===
- 1 April
  - Biochemists report finishing the complete sequence of the human genome.
  - A study shows that, contrary to widespread belief, body sizes of mammal extinction survivors of the dinosaur-times extinction event were the first to evolutionarily increase, with brain sizes increasing later in the Eocene.
- 4 April
  - The Intergovernmental Panel on Climate Change (IPCC) releases the third and final part of its Sixth Assessment Report on climate change, warning that greenhouse gas emissions must peak before 2025 at the latest and decline 43% by 2030, in order to likely limit global warming to 1.5 °C (2.7 °F).
  - Researchers announce a new technique for accelerating the development of vaccines and other pharmaceutical products by up to a million times, using much smaller quantities based on DNA nanotechnology.
  - Alzheimer's disease (AD) research progress:
    A study reports 42 new genes linked to an increased risk of AD. Researchers report a potential primary mechanism of sleep disturbance as an early-stage effect of neurodegenerative diseases. Researchers identify several genes associated with changes in brain structure over lifetime and potential AD therapy-targets (5 Apr).

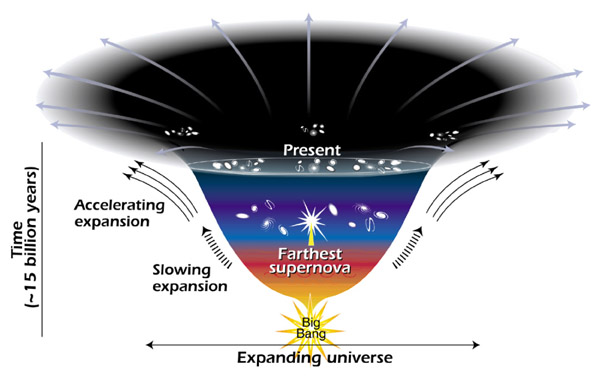
5 April: A study suggests that if "quintessence" is an explanation for dark-energy and current data is true as well, the world may start to end within the next 100 My, during which accelerating expansion of the Universe would inverse to contraction (a cyclic model).

- 5 April
  - COVID-19 pandemic: Preclinical data for a new vaccine developed at the Medical University of Vienna indicates it is effective against all SARS-CoV-2 variants known to date, including Omicron.
  - A study presents a mechanism by which the hypothesized potential dark-energy-explaining quintessence, if true, would smoothly cause the accelerating expansion of the Universe to inverse to contraction, possibly within the cosmic near-future (100 My) given current data. It concludes that its end-time scenario theory fits "naturally with cyclic cosmologies [(each a theory of cycles of universe originations and ends, rather than the theories of one Big Bang beginning of the Universe/multiverse, to which authors were major contributors)] and recent conjectures about quantum gravity".

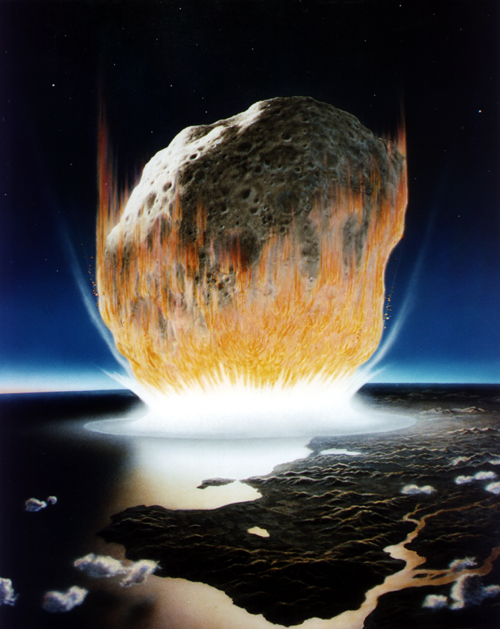
6 April: The first known dinosaur fossil linked to the actual day of the Chicxulub impact is reported.

- 6 April
  - U.S. Space Command, based on information collected from its planetary defense sensors, confirms the detection of the first known interstellar object. The purported interstellar meteorite, technically known as CNEOS 2014-01-08, impacted Earth in 2014, and was determined, based on its hyperbolic trajectory and estimated initial high velocity, to be from beyond the Solar System. The 2014 meteorite was detected three years earlier than the more recent and widely known interstellar objects, ʻOumuamua in 2017 and 2I/Borisov in 2019. Further related studies were reported on 1 September 2023.
  - The first known dinosaur fossil linked to the very day of the Chicxulub impact is reported by paleontologists at the Tanis site in North Dakota.
  - One science journalist reflects on the global management of the COVID-19 pandemic in relation to science, investigating the question "Why the WHO took two years to say COVID is airborne" – a finding hundreds of scientists reaffirmed in an open letter in July 2020 – with one indication being that this may be a major concern for many expert scientists, as evidenced by several writings published by news outlets.
  - A study decodes electrical communication between fungi into word-like components via spiking characteristics.
  - Researchers demonstrate semi-automated testing for reproducibility (which is lacking especially in cancer research) via extraction of statements about experimental results in, as of 2022 non-semantic, gene expression cancer research papers and subsequent testing with breast cancer cell lines via robot scientist "Eve".

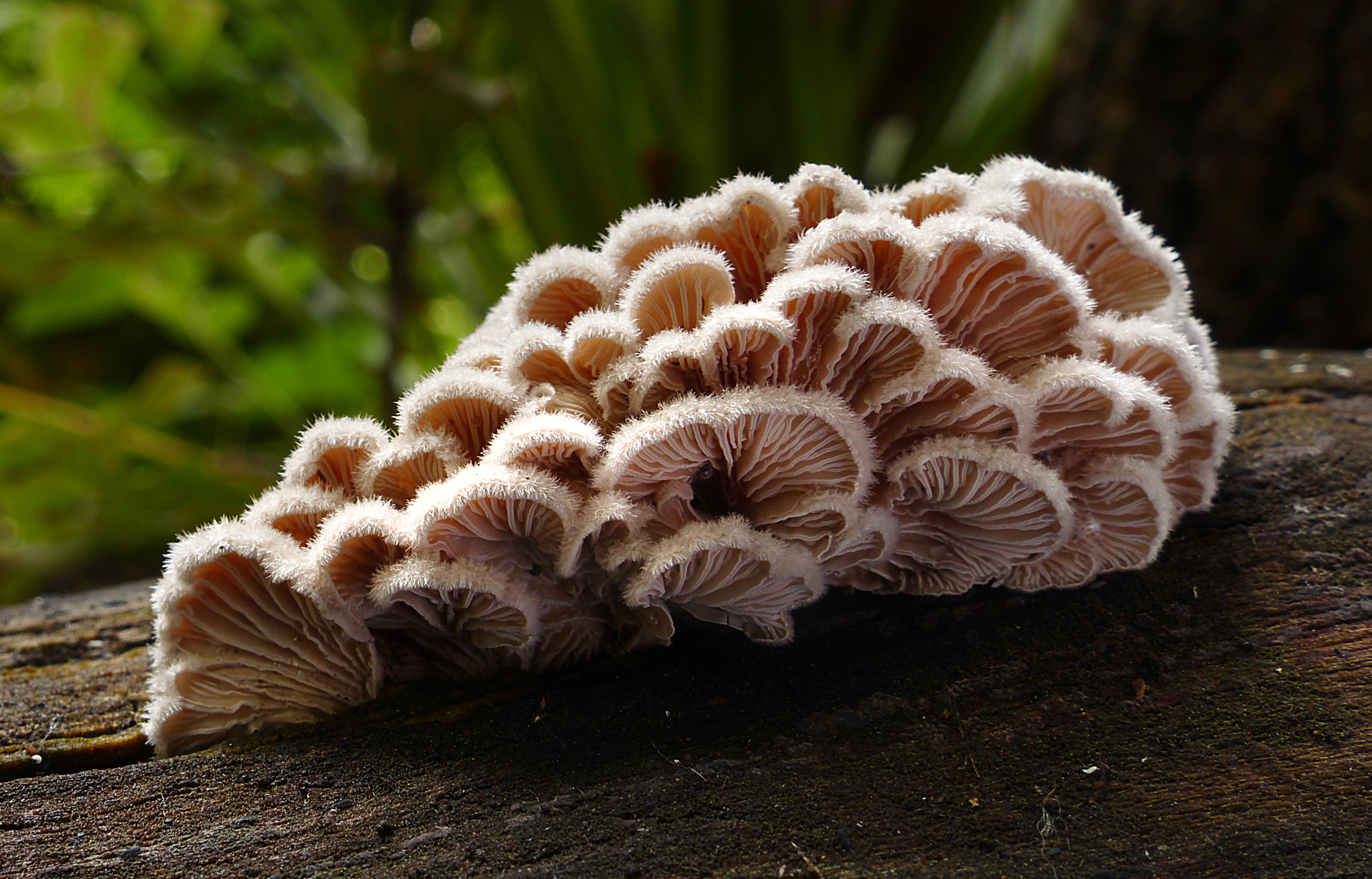
6 April: A study decodes electrical communication between fungi into word-like components.

- 7 April
  - Astronomers report the discovery of HD1, considered to be the earliest and most distant known galaxy yet identified in the observable universe, located only about 330 million years after the Big Bang 13.8 billion years ago, a light-travel distance of 13.5 billion light-years from Earth, and, due to the expansion of the universe, a present proper distance of 33.4 billion light-years.
  - Physicists from the Collider Detector at Fermilab determine the mass of the W boson with a precision of 0.01%. The result hints at a flaw in the Standard Model.
  - A trial of estimated financial energy cost of refrigerators alongside EU energy-efficiency class (EEEC) labels online finds that the approach of labels involves a trade-off between financial considerations and higher cost requirements in effort or time for the product-selection from the many available options which are often unlabelled and don't have any EEEC-requirement for being bought, used or sold within the EU.
- 8 April
  - Bioresearchers demonstrate an in vitro method (MPTR) for rejuvenation (including the transcriptome and epigenome) reprogramming in which fibroblast skin cells temporarily lose their cell identity.
  - Researchers show air pollution in fast-growing tropical cities caused ~500,000 earlier deaths in 2018 with a substantial recent and projected rise, proposing "regulatory action targeting emerging anthropogenic sources".
- 11 April – A study confirms antidepressant potential of psilocybin therapy protocols (which use the active ingredient in psilocybin mushrooms), providing fMRI data about a correlated likely major effect mechanism – global increases in brain network integration.
- 12 April – Science and the 2022 Russian invasion of Ukraine:
  An editorial in a scientific journal reports that relevant areas of food system research are patchy and lack independent assessments. An editorial projects significant gender and age imbalance in the population in Ukraine as a substantial problem if most refugees, as in other cases, do not return over time (4 Apr). A preprint reports impacts of the Ukrainian power grid synchronization with Continental Europe (15 Apr).

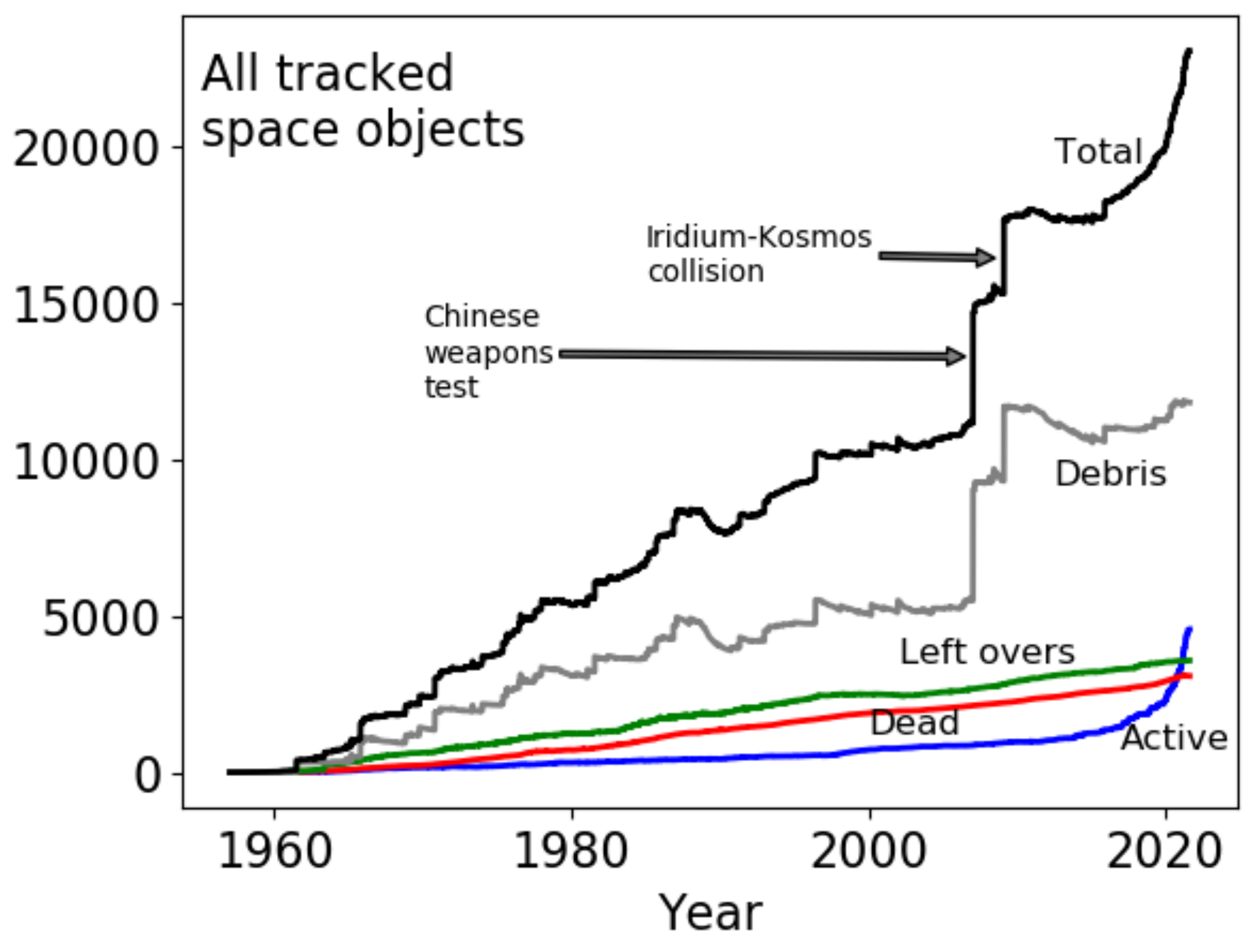
22 April: A study outlines rationale for space governance of satellites/space debris similar to terrestrial environmental regulations.

- 14 April
  - GNz7q, a distant starburst galaxy, is reported as being a "missing link" between supermassive black holes and the evolution of quasars.
  - A study describes the impact of climate change on the survival of cacti. It finds that 60% of species will experience a reduction in favourable climate by 2050–2070, with epiphytes having the greatest exposure to increased warming.
  - A preprint demonstrates how backdoors can be placed undetectably into classifying (e.g. posts as "spam" or well-visible "not spam") machine learning models which are often developed and/or trained by third parties. Parties can change the classification of any input, including in cases with types of data/software transparency, possibly including white-box access.

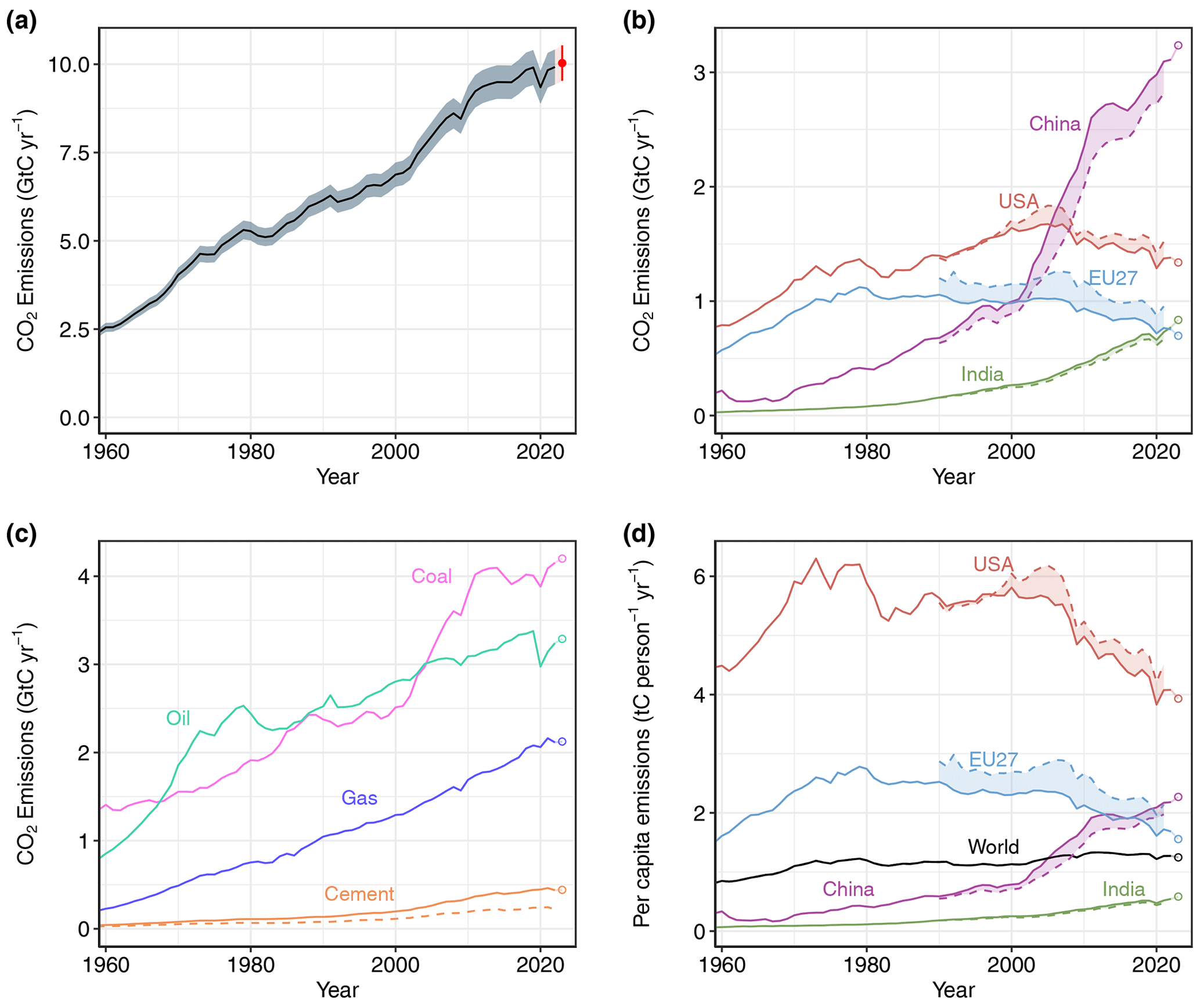
26 April: Results of the 'Global Carbon Budget 2021' pass peer-review, showing problematic continuation of GHG emissions trends.

- 16 April – A review suggests that global prevalence of long COVID conditions after infection could be as high as 43%, with the most common symptoms being fatigue and memory problems.
- 19 April – NASA publishes its Planetary Science Decadal Survey for 2023–2032. The future mission recommendations include a Uranus orbiter (the first visit to the planet since 1986) and the Enceladus Orbilander (landing in the early 2050s).
- 20 April
  - Micronovae, a previously unknown class of thermonuclear explosions on the surface of white dwarfs, are described for the first time.
  - A study shows that common single-use plastic products – such as paper coffee cups that are lined with a thin plastic film inside – release trillions of microplastics-nanoparticles per liter into water during normal use.
- 21 April – Researchers discover that humans are interrupting a 66-million-years-old feature of ecosystems, the relationship between diet and body mass, by driving the largest vertebrate animals towards extinction, which they suggest could have unpredictable consequences.
- 22 April
  - The Large Hadron Collider recommences full operations, three years after being shut down for upgrades.
  - Scientists suggest in a study that space governance of satellites/space debris should regulate the current free externalization of true costs and risks, with orbital space around the Earth being an "additional ecosystem" which should be subject to regulations as e.g. oceans on Earth.
  - Cancer research progress:
    The largest study of whole cancer genomes reports 58 new mutational signatures and shows that for each organ "cancers have a limited number of common signatures and a long tail of rare signatures". A study reports presence of certain bacteria in the prostate and urine for aggressive forms of prostate cancer, with biomarker- and therapeutic potentials being unclear (18 Apr).
- 25 April
  - Novel foods such as under-development cultured meat, existing microbial foods and ground-up insects are shown to have the potential to reduce environmental impacts by over 80% in a study.
  - A review about meat and sustainability of food systems, animal welfare, and healthy nutrition concludes that its consumption has to be reduced substantially for sustainable consumption and names broad potential measures such as "restrictions or fiscal mechanisms".
  - A new type of cell death 'erebosis' is reported after copper-dependent cell death was first reported the previous month.
- 26 April
  - Scientists report the detection of purine and pyrimidine nucleobases in several meteorites, including guanine, adenine, cytosine, uracil and thymine, and claim that such meteoritic nucleobases could serve as "building blocks of DNA and RNA on the early Earth".
  - The Global Carbon Budget 2021 concludes that fossil CO_{2} emissions rebounded by around +4.8% relative to 2020 emissions – returning to 2019 levels, identifies three major issues for improving reliable accuracy of monitoring, shows that China and India surpassed 2019 levels (by 5.7% and 3.2%) while the EU and the US stayed beneath 2019 levels (by 5.3% and 4.5%), quantifies various changes and trends, for the first time provides models' estimates that are linked to the official country GHG inventories reporting, and shows that the remaining carbon budget at 1. Jan 2022 for a 50% likelihood to limit global warming to 1.5 °C is 120 GtC (420 GtCO_{2}) – or 11 years of 2021 emissions levels.
  - Scientists propose and preliminarily evaluate a likely transgressed planetary boundary for green water in the water cycle, measured by root-zone soil moisture deviation from Holocene variability. A study published one day earlier integrates "green water" along with "blue water" into an index to measure and project water scarcity in agriculture for climate change scenarios.
- 27 April
  - A lineage of H3N8 bird flu is found to infect humans for the first time, with a case reported in the Henan province of China. Months earlier, H5 strain bird flu viruses (HPAIv) have been detected in Canada and the US.
  - A study extends global assessments of shares of species threatened by extinction with reptiles, which often play functional roles in their respective ecosystems, indicating at least 21% are threatened by extinction. One day later, scientists quantify global and local mass extinction risks of marine life from climate change and conservation potentials.
  - Researchers report routes for recycling 200 industrial waste chemicals into important drugs and agrochemicals using a software for computer-aided chemical synthesis design, helping enable "circular chemistry" as a potential area of a circular economy.
- 28 April
  - A comprehensive review reaffirms likely beneficial health effects with links to health/life extension of cycles of caloric restriction and intermittent fasting as well as reducing meat consumption in humans. It identifies issues with contemporary nutrition research approaches, proposing a multi-pillar approach, and summarizes findings towards constructing – multi-system-considering and at least age-personalized dynamic – refined longevity diets and proposes inclusion of such in standard preventive healthcare.
  - A company reports results of a phase 3 clinical trial, indicating that tirzepatide could be used for substantial weight loss – possibly larger than the, as of 2022 also expensive, semaglutide approved by the FDA in 2021 – in obese people.
  - Researchers publish projections for interspecies viral sharing, that can lead to novel viral spillovers, due to ongoing climate change-caused range-shifts of mammals (mostly bats) for use in efforts of pandemic prevention.

=== May ===
12 May: Sagittarius A*, black hole in the Galactic Center of the Milky Way, revealed by the Event Horizon Telescope team

- 1 May
  - A preprint indicates Omicron subvariants BA.4 and BA.5 can cause a large share of reinfections, beyond the increase of reinfections caused by the Omicron lineage, even for people who were infected by Omicron BA.1 due to increases in immune evasion, especially for the unvaccinated. On 18 May, a study shows that immunity from an Omicron infection for unvaccinated and previously uninfected is weak "against non-Omicron variants".
  - A preprint suggests that SARS-CoV-2 antibodies in or transmitted through the air are an unrecognized mechanism by which, transferred, passive immune protection occurs. However, if not sustained, protection from passive herd immunity is thought to wane over the course of weeks to months.
- 4 May
  - NASA reports the sonification (converting astronomical data associated with pressure waves into sound) of the black hole at the center of the Perseus galaxy cluster.
  - A single master gene that programs ear hair cells into either outer or inner ones is discovered, overcoming a major hurdle that had prevented the development of these cells to reverse hearing loss.
  - A study complements life-cycle assessment studies, showing substantial deforestation reduction (56%) and climate change mitigation if only 20% of per-capita beef was replaced by microbial protein by 2050.
  - A study suggests, using an epidemiological model, that by reducing the transferred viral load, face masks against COVID19 may be beneficial for variolation whereby "smaller infectious doses tend to yield milder infections, yet ultimately induce similar levels of immunity".
- 5 May
  - The monthly average carbon dioxide (CO_{2}) level in Earth's atmosphere exceeds 420 parts per million (ppm) for the first time in recorded history.
  - A new approach to reverse of neuropathic pain is demonstrated in animals – a gene therapy for local transgenes encoding for (releasing) GABA which is effective for months at a time.
  - A study demonstrates that a 30% caloric restriction extended life spans of male C57BL/6J mice by 10% but when combined with daily intermittent fasting and eating during the most active time of the day it extended life span by 35%.

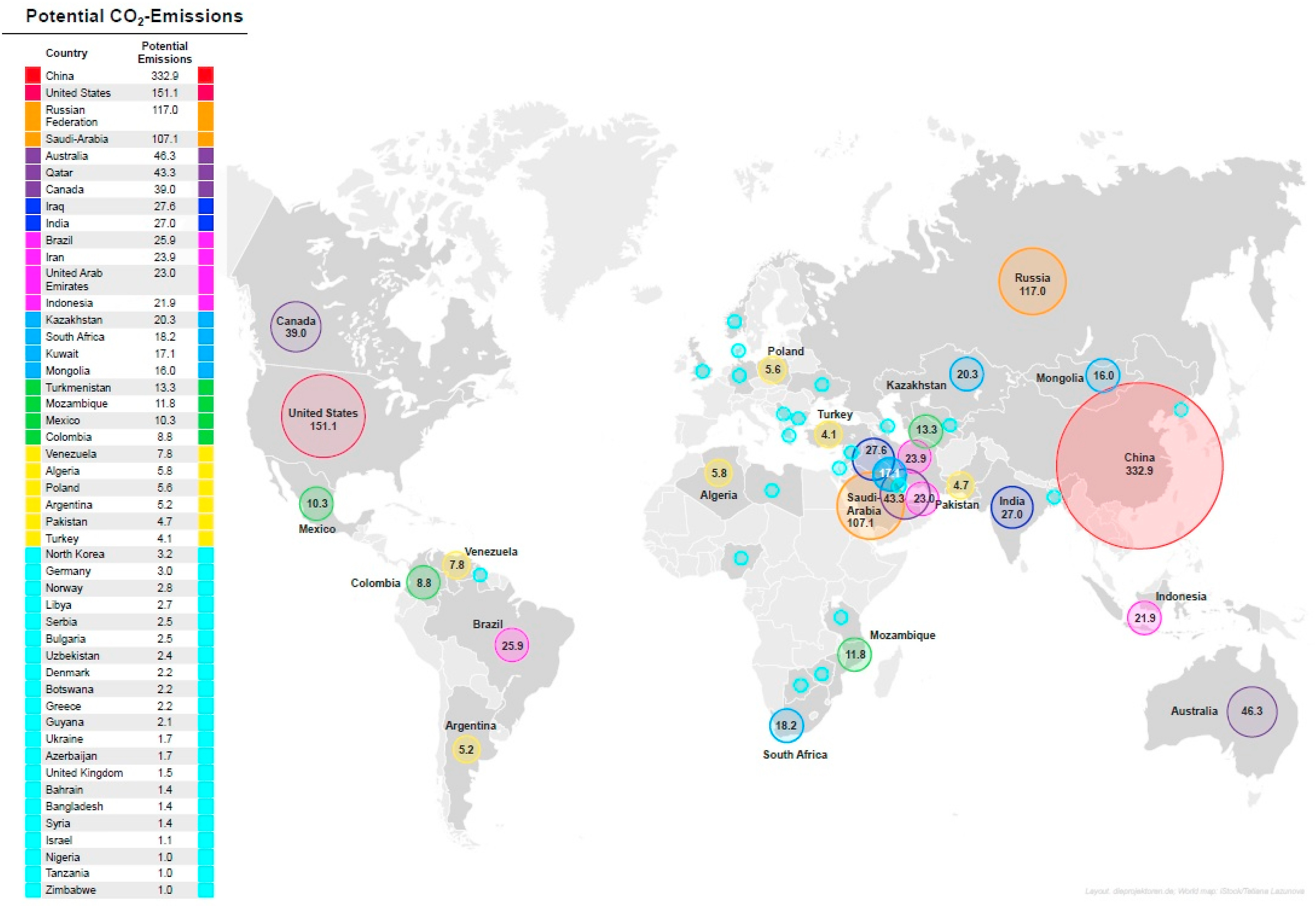
12 May: Researchers identify the 425 biggest fossil fuel extraction projects globally, 40% of which haven't yet started extraction, that threaten climate change mitigation of global climate goals.

- 6 May
  - Scientists report the discovery of 830‑million-year-old microorganisms in fluid inclusions within halite that may, potentially, still be alive. According to the researchers, "This study has implications for the search for life in both terrestrial and extraterrestrial chemical sedimentary rocks."
  - Low butyrylcholinesterase specific activity is identified as a potential biomarker for infants at risk for sudden infant death syndrome in a small crowd-funded study.
- 8 May – The UK's Met Office warns, with WMO affirmation, that the probability of global average temperatures reaching 1.5 °C above pre-industrial levels over the next five years is now almost 50:50 (48%). It also predicts a more than 90% chance that a new record high will occur in at least one year from 2022 to 2026.
- 9 May
  - A study reports that declining numbers of the largest fish on Earth, the endangered whale shark, may be linked to collisions with large vessels in the global transport fleet.
  - News outlets report about the first global, interactive AI- and satellite monitoring-based, map and analysis of plastic waste sites to help prevention of plastic pollution, especially ocean pollution.
- 10 May – A sixth mass bleaching event is recorded at the Great Barrier Reef, with 91% of corals affected.

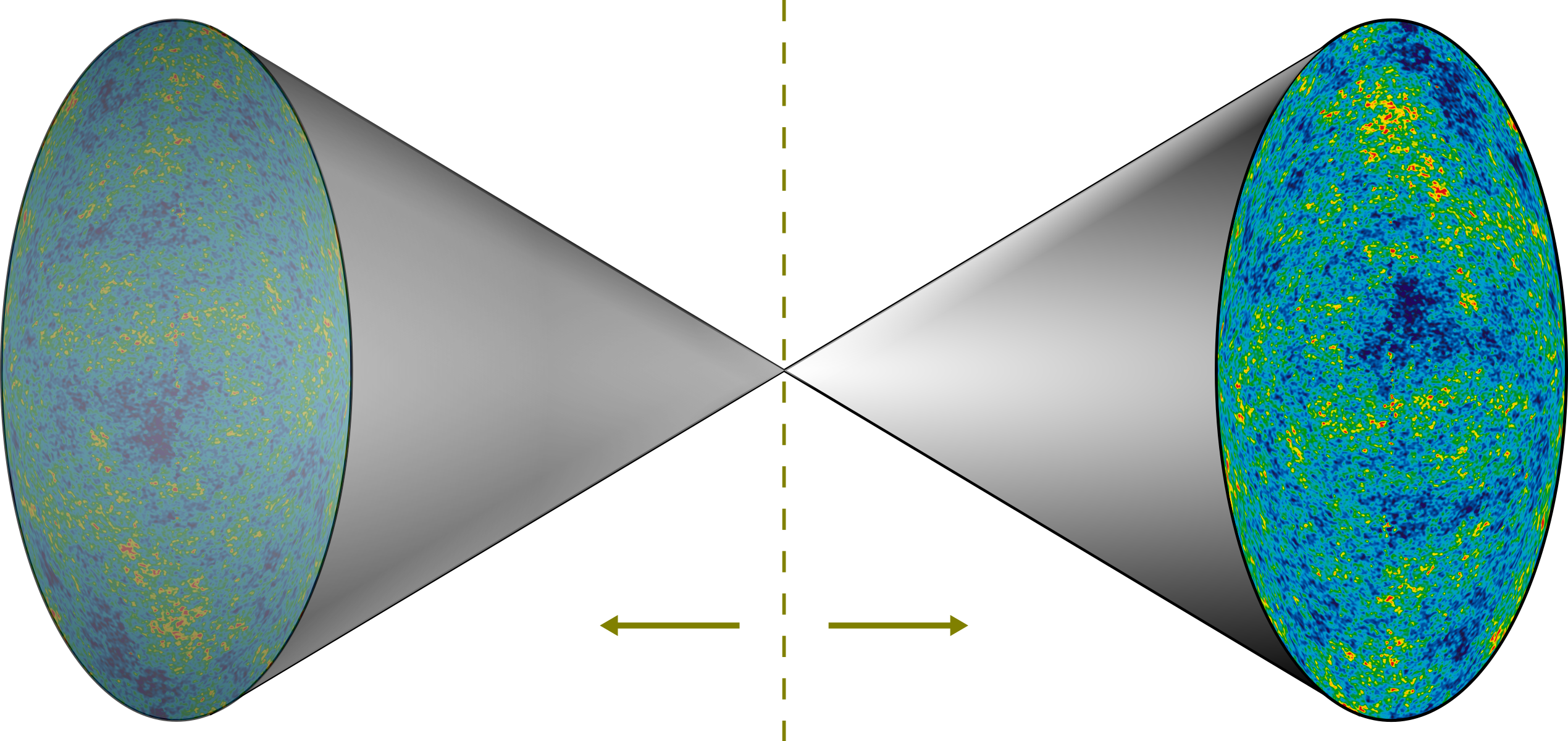
18 May and 2 May: Two separate studies show how two twin-universe cosmological models could each explain specific open problems of physics or cosmology.

- 11 May
  - A logic gate for computation at femtosecond timescales is demonstrated.
  - A study shows that infusing the nourishing cerebrospinal fluid from around brain cells of young mice into aged brains rejuvenates aspects of the brain, identifying FGF17 as a key target for potential therapeutics such as of anti-aging.
  - Scientists close a missing link in the potential origin of life from a RNA world – synergistic formation of peptides and ever-longer RNAs or peptide-decorated RNA, leading to a protein world.
  - A study suggests that in children at age 8–12 during two years, time gaming or watching digital videos can be positively correlated with measures intelligence, albeit correlations with overall screen time (including social media, socializing and TV) were not investigated and 'time gaming' did not differentiate between categories of video games (e.g. shares of games' platform and genre).
- 12 May
  - Sagittarius A*, the supermassive black hole at the center of the Milky Way galaxy, is imaged for the first time by the Event Horizon Telescope team.
  - Researchers report that lunar soil has been used to grow plants for the first time.
  - Researchers identify the 425 biggest fossil fuel extraction projects globally, of which 40% as of 2020 are new projects that haven't yet started extraction. They conclude that "defusing" these "carbon bombs" – worked on by only "few actors" to date – would be necessary for climate change mitigation of global climate goals. On 17 May, a separate study finds that "staying within a 1.5 °C carbon budget (50% probability) implies leaving almost 40% of 'developed reserves' of fossil fuels unextracted". On 26 May, a study calculates climate policies-induced future lost financial profits from global stranded fossil-fuel assets.
- 17 May
  - Isotopically pure silicon-28 nanowires are shown to conduct heat 150% better than regular silicon, with potential for improved cooling of computer chips.
  - A review concludes that, like in 2015, pollution (3/4 from air pollution) was responsible for 9 million premature deaths in 2019 (one in six deaths). It concludes that little real progress against pollution can be identified and outlines needs for attention and action such as a "formal science–policy interface".
  - A trial shows that Urolithin A can improve muscle strength, exercise performance, and biomarkers of mitochondrial health.
- 18 May
  - NASA reports that the Voyager 1 spacecraft, the farthest human-made object, is sending data that does not reflect what is happening on board with the antenna apparently remaining in its prescribed orientation to Earth. On 17 June, it was reported that NASA is preparing to power down the two Voyager spacecraft in the hope of using the remaining power to extend their operation to about 2030.
  - A study shows how a Twin-world models cosmological model – already extensively studied to find out why gravity appears much weaker than other known forces – could explain the Hubble constant (H_{0}) tension via interactions between the two worlds. The "mirror world" would contain copies of all existing fundamental particles. On 2 May, another twin/pair-world or "bi-worlds" cosmology is shown to theoretically be able to solve the cosmological constant (Λ) problem, closely related to dark energy: two interacting worlds with a large Λ each resulting in a small shared effective Λ. Previous similar models e.g. attempt to explain the baryon asymmetry – why there was more matter than antimatter at the beginning – with a mirror anti-universe.
- 19 May
  - Scientists report that RNA was found to be formed spontaneously on prebiotic basalt lava glass which is presumed to have been abundantly available on the early Earth.
  - The yellow-billed hornbill of southern Africa, famous for its role in Disney's The Lion King, is reported to be at risk of extinction due to rising temperatures in the region.
  - Boeing starts the one-week second uncrewed test flight of its Starliner space capsule in advance of its first crewed test flight later in 2022.
  - A study estimates losses of 61 metals to help the development of circular economy strategies, showing that usespans of, often scarce, tech-critical metals are short.
- 20 May – Global warming is projected to substantially erode sleep worldwide.

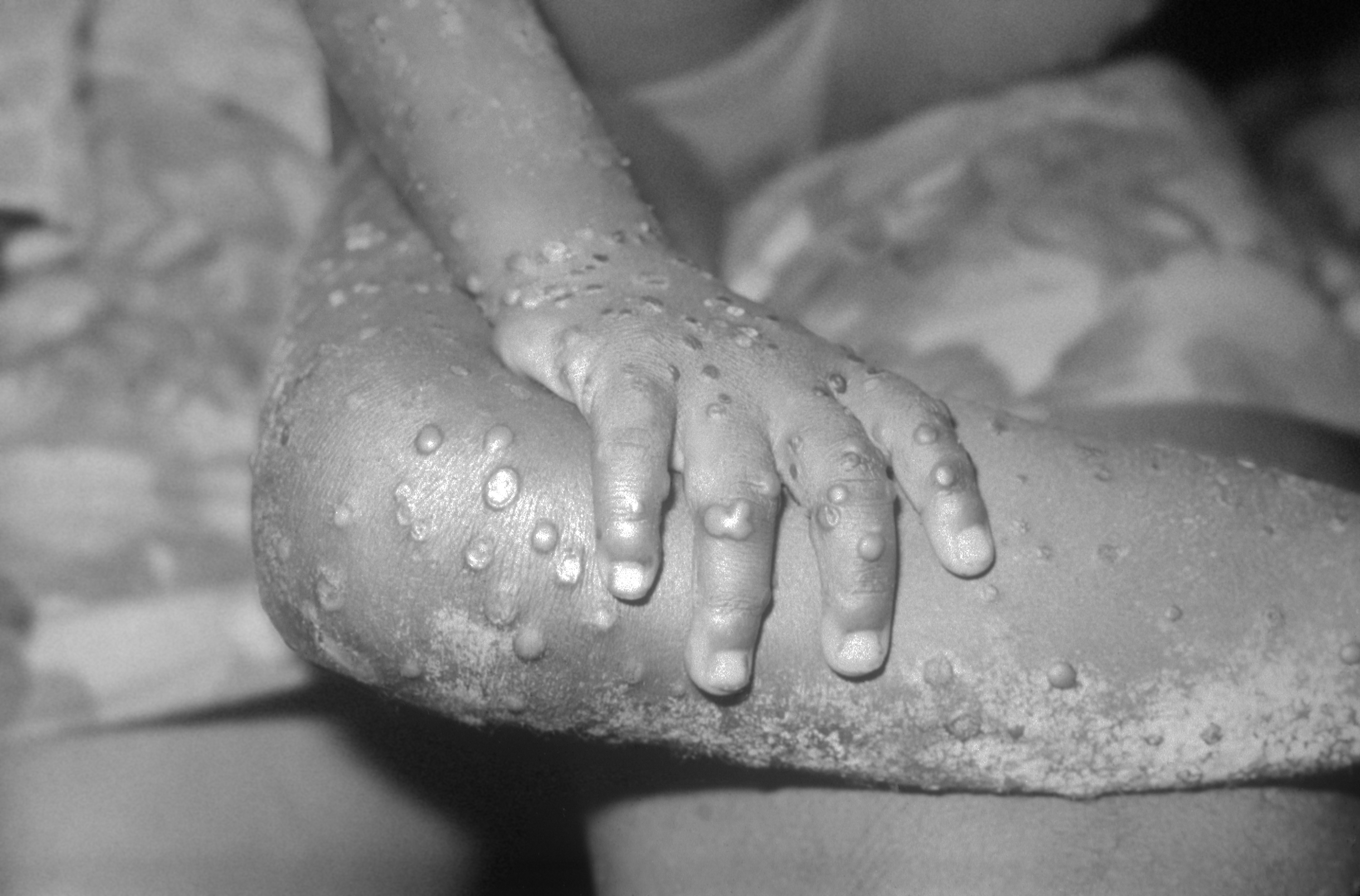
21 May: The World Health Organization confirms a monkeypox outbreak in 12 non-endemic countries.

- 21 May
  - The WHO informs about the international 2022 monkeypox outbreak in non-endemic countries – an unprecedented number of cases detected outside of Africa after the first of these cases was detected on 6 May. On 24 May, the WHO states that the outbreak can be contained. The main method used for the early containment is 'ring vaccination' – vaccinating close contacts of positive cases via existing vaccines.
- 23 May
  - Researchers report that CRISPR-Cas9 gene editing has been used to boost vitamin D in tomatoes.
  - A study shows why decarbonization must be accompanied by strategies to reduce the levels of short-lived climate pollutants with near-term effects for climate goals.
- 24 May
  - Scientists report the first 3D-printed lab-grown wood. It is unclear if it could ever be used on a commercial scale (e.g. with sufficient production efficiency and quality).
  - A CDC study based on electronic health records shows that "one in five COVID-19 survivors aged 18–64 years and one in four survivors aged ≥65 years experienced at least one incident condition that might be attributable to previous COVID-19" or long COVID. On 18 May, an analysis of private healthcare claims shows that of 78,252 patients diagnosed with 'long COVID', 75.8% had not been hospitalized for COVID-19.
- 25 May – The world's smallest remote-controlled walking robot, measuring just half a millimetre wide, is demonstrated. Potential applications include the clearing of blocked arteries.
- 26 May – A climate change study reveals that storms in the Southern Hemisphere have already reached intensity levels previously predicted to occur only in the year 2080.

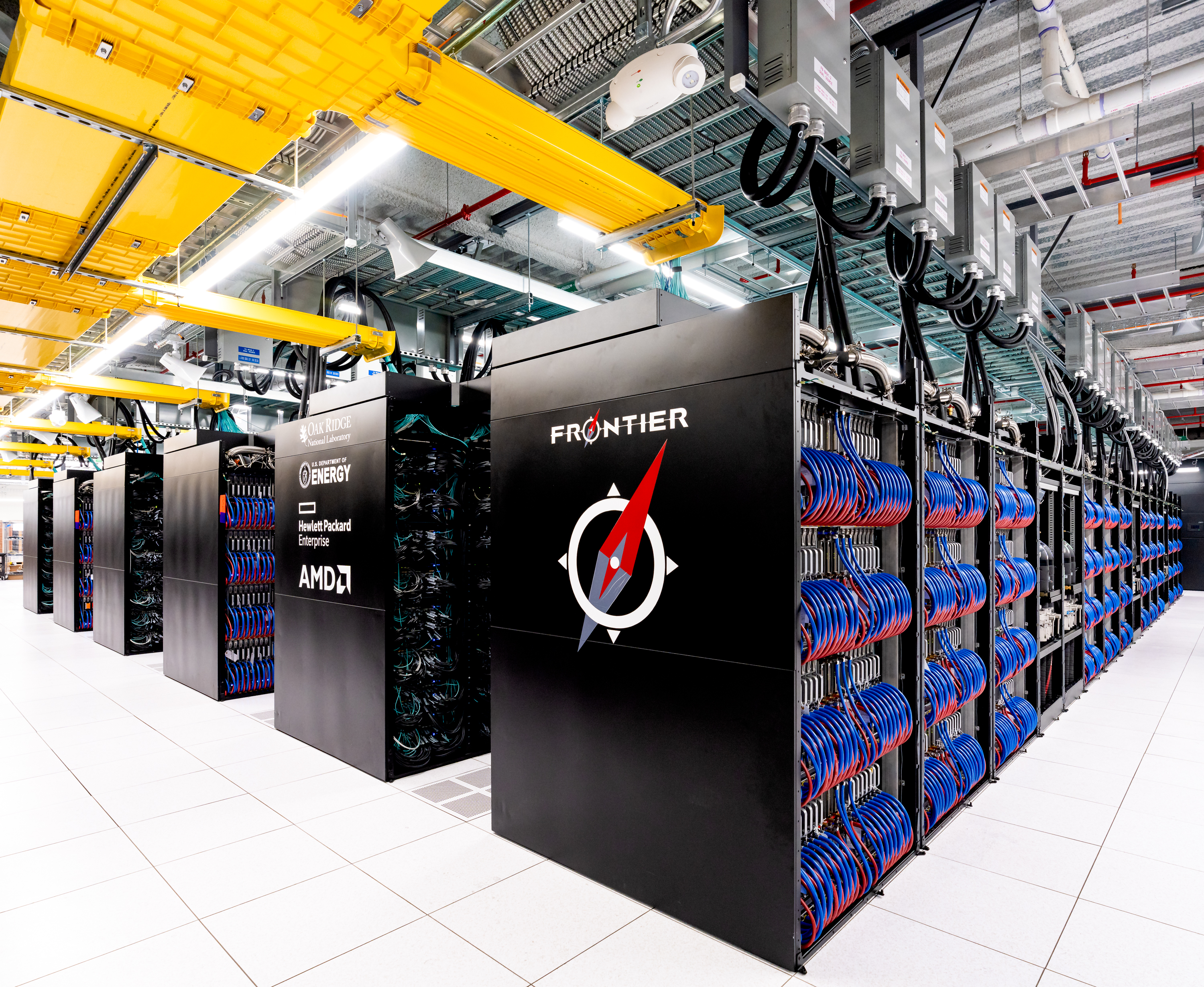
30 May: Frontier is confirmed as the world's first exascale supercomputer.

- 27 May
  - A new compact CRISPR gene editing tool better suited for therapeutic (temporary) RNA editing than Cas13 is reported, Cas7-11, – of which an early version was used for in vitro editing in 2021.
  - Science and the 2022 Russian invasion of Ukraine:
    According to a news report academics in Russia are compiling or circulating a list of researchers who have supported Russia's invasion to prevent them from being elected to the Russian Academy of Sciences. An editorial published in a journal notes that remote surgery and types of videoconferencing for sharing expertise (e.g. ad hoc assistance) have been and could be used to support doctors in Ukraine (3 May). A forum contribution analyzes Russian users' reactions to the Bucha massacre on social media – on nationalist Telegram channels (9 May). The FAO estimates that "at least 20 percent of Ukraine's winter crops" "may not be harvested or planted" (13 May). A preprint estimates potential impacts of the EU embargoing fossil fuels from Russia, suggesting implementing such via a partial embargo with tariffs may be beneficial (25 May).
- 28 May – A new direct air capture system using isophorone diamine is demonstrated, able to remove carbon dioxide with 99% efficiency and more than twice as fast as existing systems.
- 30 May – Frontier is announced by Oak Ridge National Laboratory as the world's first exascale supercomputer.
- 31 May – Success of record-long (3 days rather than usually <12 hours) of human transplant organ preservation with machine perfusion of a liver is reported. It could possibly be extended to 10 days and prevent substantial cell damage by low temperature preservation methods. On the same day, a separate study reports new cryoprotectant solvents, tested with cells, that could preserve organs by the latter methods for much longer with substantially reduced damage.

=== June ===
1 June: A study substantiates a novel theory of ageing – clonal diversity loss of hematopoietic stem cells – which could enable healthy aging.

3 June: The global CO_{2} level exceeds the milestone of being 50% greater than in the pre-industrial era

- 1 June – A study shows the clonal diversity of stem cells that produce blood cells gets drastically reduced around age 70 to a faster-growing few, substantiating a novel theory of ageing which could enable healthy aging.
- 2 June – First success of a clinical trial for a 3D bioprinted transplant, an external ear to treat microtia, that is made from the patient's own cells is reported.
- 3 June – The NOAA reports that the global concentration of carbon dioxide in Earth's atmosphere is now 50% greater than in pre-industrial times, and is likely at a level last seen 4.1 to 4.5 million years ago, at 421 parts per million (ppm).
- 5 June – Progress in the treatment of cancer:
  A very small trial shows complete remission of a type of colorectal cancer without surgery and radiation in all 12 patients. On the same day, results of a trial show that trastuzumab deruxtecan therapy for HER2-low metastatic breast cancer exceeded results from chemotherapy. The synthesis of ERX-41, a novel compound that has shown promise in eliminating cancer cells, is reported (2 June). Researchers describe a new light-activated 'photoimmunotherapy' for brain cancer in vitro. They believe it could join surgery, chemotherapy, radiotherapy and immunotherapy as a fifth major form of cancer treatment (16 June).
- 6 June – Cats are added to the list of animals that can get SARS-CoV-2 and spread it back to humans, albeit the transmission is considered uncommon and not to be a source of variants of concern since the August 2021 detection.

24 June: Early 2022 monkeypox outbreak research finds the "presumably slow-evolving" DNA virus has evolved roughly 6–12-fold more mutations than one would expect.

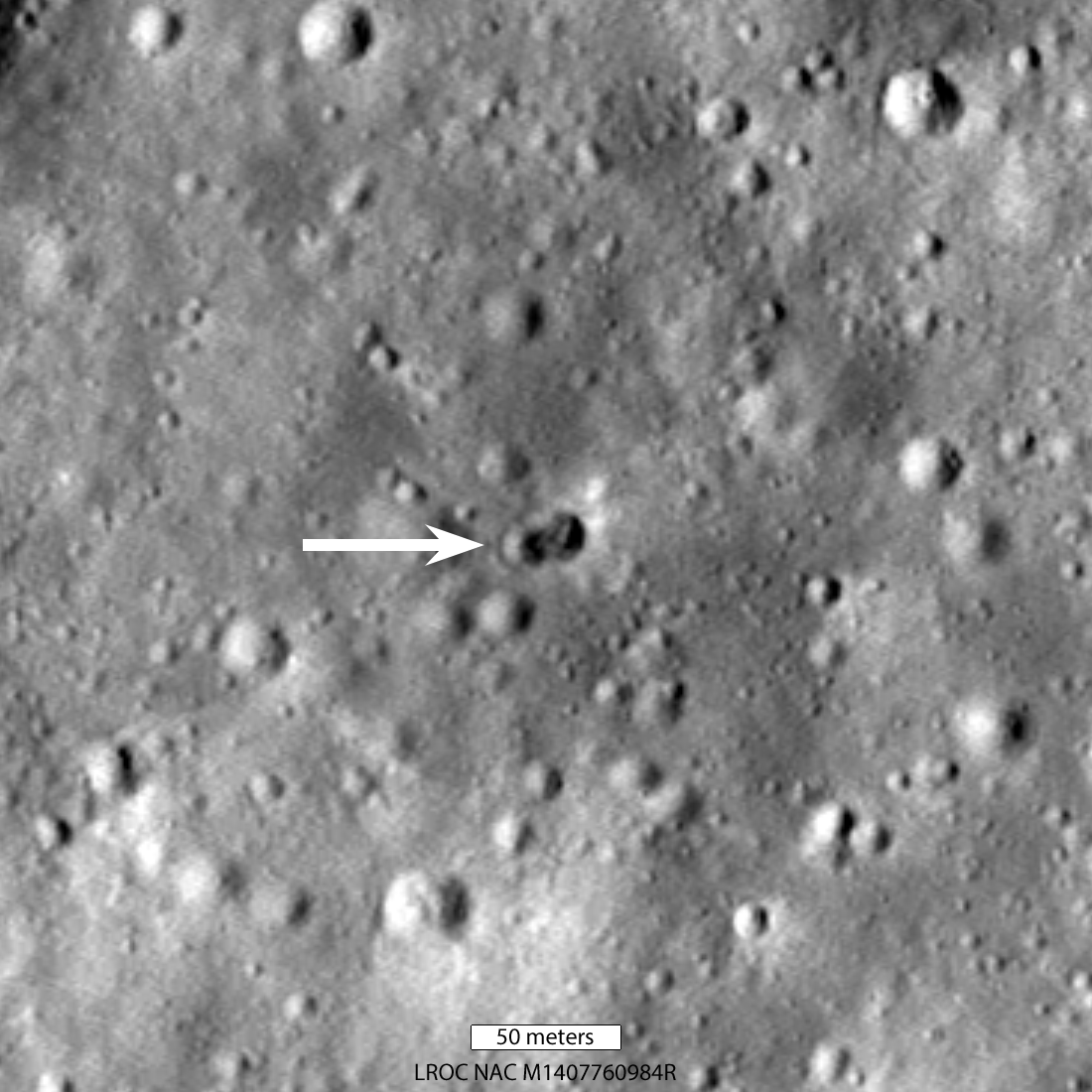
24 June: NASA publishes images showing an unexpected double crater from what is thought to be the first time human space debris – likely by a spent rocket body – unintentionally hit the lunar surface on 4 March.

- 8 June
  - Observation of the axial Higgs mode, a Higgs boson-like excitation in a charge density wave material, is reported. It was incorrectly reported in some press releases as a dark matter particle.
  - Scientists provide an overview of the capabilities of missions and observatories for detecting various alien technosignatures.
- 9 June
  - A study estimates the air pollution impacts on climate change and the ozone layer from rocket launches and re-entry of reusable components and debris in 2019 and from a theoretical future space industry extrapolated from the "billionaire space race". It concludes that substantial effects from routine space tourism should "motivate regulation".
  - Researchers report a robotic finger covered in a type of manufactured living human skin. Researchers demonstrate an electronic skin giving biological skin-like haptic sensations and touch/pain-sensitivity to a robotic hand (1 June). A system of an electronic skin and a human-machine interface is reported that can enable remote sensed tactile perception, and wearable or robotic sensing of many hazardous substances and pathogens (1 June). A multilayer tactile sensor hydrogel-based robot skin is demonstrated (8 June).
- 10 June – The core of the globular cluster NGC 3201 is shown to harbor a sub-cluster of nearly a hundred black holes. The same study also confirms that the globular cluster NGC 6397 has ejected most of its original black hole population, and its inner mass excess is composed by hundreds of massive white dwarfs.
- 13 June – Science and the 2022 Russian invasion of Ukraine:
  Groups of academics report how global science community could help Ukraine via an action plan, including for helping organizing (re)vitalization of Ukrainian science and reconstruction in the future. On the same day, a researcher outlined a number of possible major policy-based actions that could mitigate the energy and resource crises caused or exacerbated by the war. Russian space agency Roscosmos announces the intent to, unilaterally and hazardously, take over paused telescope eROSITA, launched in collaboration with Germany (4 June). A science journalist outlines some of the food system-related environmental impacts of the war (21 June). A study reports a number of humanitarian, economic, and financial impacts of the war (23 June).
- 15 June
  - Astronomers identify J1144 as the fastest-growing black hole of the last nine billion years, consuming matter equivalent to one Earth every second, as well as being the most luminous quasi-stellar object of that period.
  - Researchers report Lac-Phe as the most significantly induced circulating metabolite in two animal models of exercise which – including via chronic administration – reduces food intake and suppresses obesity.
- 20 June
  - A study suggests global food miles CO_{2} emissions are 3.5–7.5 times higher than previously estimated, with transport accounting for about 19% of total food-system emissions, albeit shifting towards plant-based diets remains substantially more important.
  - Researchers demonstrate an MRI-ML-based approach that can diagnose early Alzheimer's disease with high accuracy and may help identify unknown related changes in the brain.
- 21 June – The inability to stand on one leg for 10 seconds in mid to later life is linked to a near-doubling in the risk of death from any cause within the next 10 years.
- 22 June
  - A study concludes that the spread of breast cancer accelerates during sleep.
  - Agilicious, an open-source and open-hardware versatile standardized quadrotor drone, currently tailored toward agility, is released.
  - The world's first quantum computer integrated circuit is demonstrated.
- 23 June
  - The largest known bacterium, and an organism that has encapsulated DNA despite being identified as a prokaryote and not an eukaryote, with an average length of 10 mm, T. magnifica is reported.
  - A review shows prevalence of long COVID conditions – like mood symptoms, fatigue and sleep disorders – in people age 0–18 years appears to be at ~25% overall.
  - Two studies about aging-related characteristics of long-lived animals like turtles are published, identifying potentially causal protective traits and suggesting many of the species have "slow or negligible senescence" (or aging).
  - Researchers report the controlled growth of diverse foods in the dark via solar energy and electrocatalysis-based artificial photosynthesis as a potential way to increase energy efficiency of food production and reduce its environmental impacts.
- 24 June
  - NASA publishes images showing an unexpected and unexplained double crater from what is thought to be the first time human space debris – likely by a spent rocket body – unintentionally hit the lunar surface on 4 March.
  - Early 2022 monkeypox outbreak research:
    A study reports phylogenomic characterization of the first monkeypox (MP) virus outbreak genome sequences, finding the "presumably slow-evolving" DNA virus has evolved roughly 6–12-fold more mutations than one would expect and 15 SNP mutations since the beginning of the outbreak. The WHO announces that MP is not yet a global public health emergency but a cause for deep concern (25 June). Early overviews and reviews, including about current knowledge about MP prevention and treatment, are published. Scientists are investigating circulating lineages (and potential variants) of the MP virus and compare them to the African endemic lineages. A preprint suggests that cases "where a small fraction of individuals have disproportionately large numbers of partners, can explain the sustained growth of monkeypox cases among the MSM population" (13 June). The MP incubation period is estimated to be 8.5 days on average and up to 21 days (16 June). The 3D-folded structures of the whole proteome of the current DNA virus are predicted, which may be useful for the development of (better or updated) vaccines and drugs (28 June). A study indicates MP contaminated surfaces within hospitals and households could be infectious (30 June).
- 25 June – A study indicates that the Arctic is warming four times faster than global warming now, substantially faster than current CMIP6 models could project.
- 27 June
  - With a small catalog of unknown bacteria, researchers suggest work on microbes soon to be released from melting glaciers across the world to identify and understand potential threats in advance and understand extremophiles.
  - Progress in climate change mitigation (CCM) living review-like works:
    The living document-like aggregation, assessment, integration and review website Project Drawdown adds 11 new CCM solutions to its organized set of mitigation techniques. The website's modeling framework is used in a study document to show that metal recycling has significant potential for CCM (2 June). A revised or updated version of a major worldwide 100% renewable energy proposed plan and model is published (28 June).
- 28 June
  - Physicists report that interstellar quantum communication by other civilizations could be possible and may be advantageous, identifying some potential challenges and factors for detecting such. They may use, for example, X-ray photons for remotely established channels and quantum teleportation as the communication mode.
  - A review elucidates the current state of climate change extreme event attribution science, concluding probabilities and costs-severities of links as well as identifying potential ways for its improvement.
- 30 June
  - Samsung announces the first mass production of computer chips using a 3 nm process. These feature a gate-all-around transistor architecture that reduces power consumption by up to 45%, improves performance by 23% and reduces area by 16% compared to 5 nm.
  - Researchers, health organizations and regulators are discussing, investigating and partly recommending COVID-19 vaccine boosters that mix the original vaccine formulation with Omicron-adjusted parts – such as spike proteins of a specific Omicron subvariant – to better prepare the immune system to recognize a wide variety of variants amid substantial and ongoing immune evasion by Omicron.

== Deaths ==
- 1 April – Gerhard J. Woeginger, Austrian mathematician.
- 5 April – Sidney Altman, Canadian-American molecular biologist, Nobel Prize laureate (1989).
- 5 April – Bjarni Tryggvason, Icelandic-born Canadian astronaut (STS-85).
- 5 April – Eelco Visser, Dutch computer scientist.
- 5 April – Leslie Young, New Zealand economist.
- 1 May – Ray Freeman, British chemist.
- 1 May – Dominique Lecourt, French philosopher.
- 2 May – Joseph Raz, Israeli philosopher.
- 4 May – Amanda Claridge, Canadian archaeologist.
- 7 May – Sir Paul Mellars, British archaeologist.
- 8 May – Harry Dornbrand, American aerospace engineer.
- 8 May – Zhuang Qiaosheng, Chinese geneticist and wheat breeder, member of the Chinese Academy of Sciences.
- 9 May – John H. Coates, Australian mathematician.
- 14 May – Bernard Bigot, French physicist and civil servant, director general of ITER (b. 1950)
- 9 June – Gordon M. Shepherd, American neuroscientist.

== See also ==
- 2020s#Global goals and issues
- Category:Science events
- Category:Science timelines
- List of emerging technologies
- List of years in science
