= Direct collapse black hole =

High-mass black hole seeds

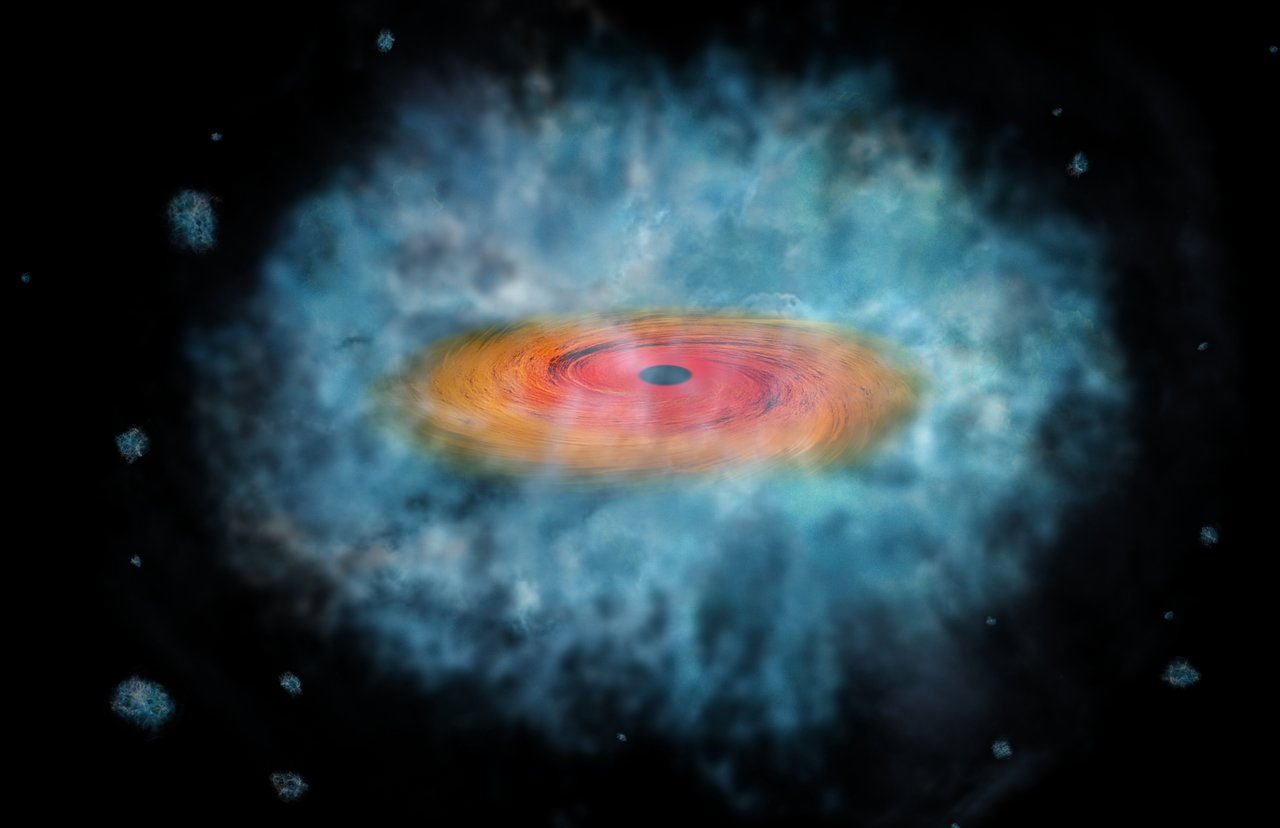
Artist's impression for the formation of a massive black hole seed via the direct black hole channel.

Direct collapse black holes (DCBHs) are high-mass black hole seeds (black holes that will later accrete to form supermassive black holes) that form from the direct collapse of a large amount of material. They putatively formed within the redshift range z=15–30, when the Universe was about 100–250 million years old. This was around the same time that stars were being formed, meaning that these black holes could not have formed from stellar collapse. Unlike seeds formed from the first population of stars (also known as Population III stars), direct collapse black hole seeds are formed by a direct, general relativistic instability. They are very massive, with a typical mass at formation of ~10^{5} M_{☉}. This category of black hole seeds was originally proposed theoretically to alleviate the challenge in building supermassive black holes already at redshift z~7, as numerous observations to date have confirmed.

A possible DCBH has been detected in the Infinity Galaxy in 2025 by Pieter Van Dokkum of Yale University and his research team.

== Formation ==
Direct collapse black holes (DCBHs) are massive black hole seeds theorized to have formed in the high-redshift Universe and with typical masses at formation of ~10^{5} M_{☉}, but spanning between 10^{4} M_{☉} and 10^{6} M_{☉}. The environmental physical conditions to form a DCBH (as opposed to a cluster of stars) are the following:

1. Metal-free gas (gas containing only hydrogen and helium).
2. Atomic-cooling gas.
3. Sufficiently large flux of Lyman–Werner photons, in order to destroy hydrogen molecules, which are very efficient gas coolants.

These conditions are necessary to avoid gas cooling and fragmentation of the primordial gas cloud which would lead to star formation. Unable to form stars, the entire gas cloud undergoes a gravitational collapse, reaching extremely high matter density at its core, on the order of ~10^{7} g/cm^{3}, and central temperatures as high as ~10^{10} K. At this density, the object undergoes a general relativistic instability, which leads to the formation of a black hole of a typical mass ~10^{5} M_{☉}, and up to 1 million M_{☉}. The occurrence of the general relativistic instability, as well as the absence of the intermediate stellar phase, led to the denomination of direct collapse black hole. In other words, these objects collapse directly from the primordial gas cloud, not from a stellar progenitor as prescribed in standard black hole models. At metallicities greater than ~10^{−5} Z_{⊙}, fragmentation occurs due to the cooling of dust. Stars located at the center of accretion become supermassive due to the large amount of gas provided by fragmentation. This process is called "supercompetitive accretion".

A computer simulation reported in July 2022 showed that a halo at the rare convergence of strong, cold accretion flows can create massive black holes seeds without the need for ultraviolet backgrounds, supersonic streaming motions or even atomic cooling. Cold flows produced turbulence in the halo, which suppressed star formation. In the simulation, no stars formed in the halo until it had grown to 40 million solar masses at a redshift of 25.7 when the halo's gravity was finally able to overcome the turbulence; the halo then collapsed and formed two supermassive stars that died as DCBHs of 31,000 and 40,000 M_{☉}.

== Demography ==
Direct collapse black holes are generally thought to be extremely rare objects in the high-redshift Universe, because the three fundamental conditions for their formation (see above in section Formation) are challenging to be met all together in the same gas cloud. Current cosmological simulations suggest that DCBHs could be as rare as only about 1 per cubic gigaparsec at redshift 15. The prediction on their number density is highly dependent on the minimum flux of Lyman–Werner photons required for their formation and can be as large as ~10^{7} DCBHs per cubic gigaparsec in the most optimistic scenarios.

In a 2023 study, N-body simulations combined with semi-analytic galaxy evolution models showed that at z ~ 10, halos with ~10^{9} M_{☉} to ~10^{10} M_{☉} typically host multiple DCBHs, which later merge into more massive halos. The study, utilizing the Press-Schechter model, further predicts that present-day halos with masses ranging from ~10^{10} M_{☉} to ~10^{11} M_{☉} contain DCBHs, a result supported by observed halo occupation fractions. This suggests that DCBH formation scenarios may account for a significant amount of supermassive black holes (SMBHs) formed in the universe.

Previous research on the formation of DCBHs at high redshifts (z >~ 13) support this model, indicating that DCBHs formed abundantly in the early universe at redshifts around z~14 with rapid growth, where the presence of DCBHs enhanced the formation of additional DCBHs in a positive feedback loop. This process, which peaked at z~14 and declined by z~13, aligns with the predicted evolution of DCBH-hosting halos at lower redshifts, including present-day halos. The rapid early growth of DCBHs could lead to their merging into more massive halos, a process consistent with the observed evolution of these halos at lower redshifts. These findings suggest that DCBHs could be key contributors to the formation of supermassive black holes observed in later epochs.

== Detection ==
In 2016, a team led by Harvard University astrophysicist Fabio Pacucci claimed to identify the first two candidate direct collapse black holes, using data from the Hubble Space Telescope and the Chandra X-ray Observatory. However this claim was challenged by subsequent work.

The two candidates, both at redshift $z > 6$, were found in the CANDELS GOODS-S field and matched the spectral properties predicted for this type of astrophysical sources. In particular, these sources are predicted to have a significant excess of infrared radiation, when compared to other categories of sources at high redshift. Additional observations, in particular with the James Webb Space Telescope, will be crucial to investigate the properties of these sources and confirm their nature.

Another candidate was identified in 2025 using the NASA COSMOS-Web survey at z~1.14 by Pieter Van Dokkum of Yale University and his research team. It is a merging pair of disk galaxies, called the Infinity Galaxy, each with supermassive black holes at their centers and a third at the center of the merge. The idea is that when these two galaxies merged about 50 million years ago the point of contact between the galaxies was dense enough to directly collapse the gas into a black hole. Their observations utilizing JWST, Hubble, the Very Large Array, and the Chandra X-Ray Observatory have ruled out the possibility that the central black hole is a part of another distant galaxy or that it is a runaway. Additional observations need to be made to confirm whether it is a direct collapse black hole or not.

== Difference from primordial and stellar collapse black holes ==
A primordial black hole is the result of the direct collapse of energy, ionized matter, or both, during the inflationary or radiation-dominated eras, while a direct collapse black hole is the result of the collapse of unusually dense and large regions of gas. A stellar black hole first has a stellar phase where it undergoes nuclear fusion. Once the star's core has fused its available light elements and is unable to fuse heavier elements in its core, it goes supernova and produces either a neutron star (which can evolve into a black hole through accretion) or a black hole.

== See also ==
- Quasi-star
- UHZ1
- QSO J0313−1806
- GNz7q
- CEERS 1019
