= Infinity Galaxy =

Pair of colliding ring galaxies

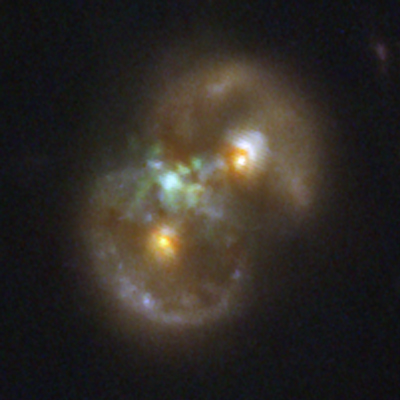
- Infinity galaxy imaged by James Webb's NIRCam instrument

Observation data (J2000 epoch)
- Constellation: Sextans
- Right ascension: 10^{h} 00^{m} 27.9^{s}
- Declination: +02° 12′ 03.5″
- Redshift: 1.14
- Distance: ~ 8.3 Bly

Characteristics
- Type: Ring galaxies; Pair of galaxies; Interacting galaxies; Active galactic nuclei

Other designations
- ∞ Galaxy; Cosmic Owl

The Infinity Galaxy (∞ Galaxy), also known as the Cosmic Owl, is an interacting galaxy pair approximately 8 billion light-years away observed by the James Webb Space Telescope (JWST) as part of the COSMOS-Web Survey. The galaxy is named due to its distinctive shape, which resembles the infinity symbol (∞). The 2025 discovery is credited to astronomers Pieter van Dokkum of Yale University and Gabriel Brammer of the University of Copenhagen. The galaxy is likely one of the first observed examples of the direct collapse mechanism of black-hole formation.

== Discovery ==
The Infinity Galaxy was identified in 2025 through archival data from JWST's COSMOS-Web survey, a large-scale program designed to map the structure of the early universe. The galaxy's unique morphology was first noted in infrared images captured by JWST's Near-Infrared Camera (NIRCam), with light represented at 0.9 microns (blue), 1.15 and 1.5 microns (green), and 2.0 microns (red). Archival observations of the COSMOS-Web field from the Chandra X-ray Observatory (CXO) and the Very Large Array (VLA) and new Keck/LRIS spectra confirmed the presence of an active supermassive black hole between the two nuclei.

The galaxy pair was independently discovered by a second team led by Mingyu Li, who dubbed it the Cosmic Owl.

== Structure ==
The Infinity Galaxy is characterized by two compact red nuclei, each surrounded by a ring of stars and gas. The structure is attributed to the head-on collision of two disk or ring galaxies approximately 50 million years ago, as evidenced by the relative velocities of the component disks. The two disks are separated by an ionized-hydrogen-dominated collisional front likely experiencing bursty star formation as a result of gas compression and tidal interaction between the component disks as well as radio-jet feedback from an active galactic nucleus in one of the component galaxies.

=== Black holes ===
The Infinity Galaxy hosts three active supermassive black holes. Two black holes lie within the compact nuclei of each galaxy, indicative of the pre-merger galaxies' central black holes; however, one black hole of approximately 1 million solar masses lies within the collisional front between the two component disks. This black hole is of particular interest, as its formation aligns with predictions by the heavy-seed direct-collapse model, where a massive gas cloud or filament collapses into a black hole without star formation. This hypothesis is supported by JWST spectroscopic data, showing that the central black hole's radial velocity matches that of the surrounding gas (within 50 km/s), implying that the black hole may have formed in situ during the galactic merger.

== Future research ==
Ongoing analysis of JWST's COSMOS-Web data may reveal additional galaxies with similar characteristics, further testing the direct-collapse model of black-hole formation.

== See also ==
- NGC 2207 and IC 2163
