= Cosmic Assembly Near-infrared Deep Extragalactic Legacy Survey =

Hubble Space Telescope project

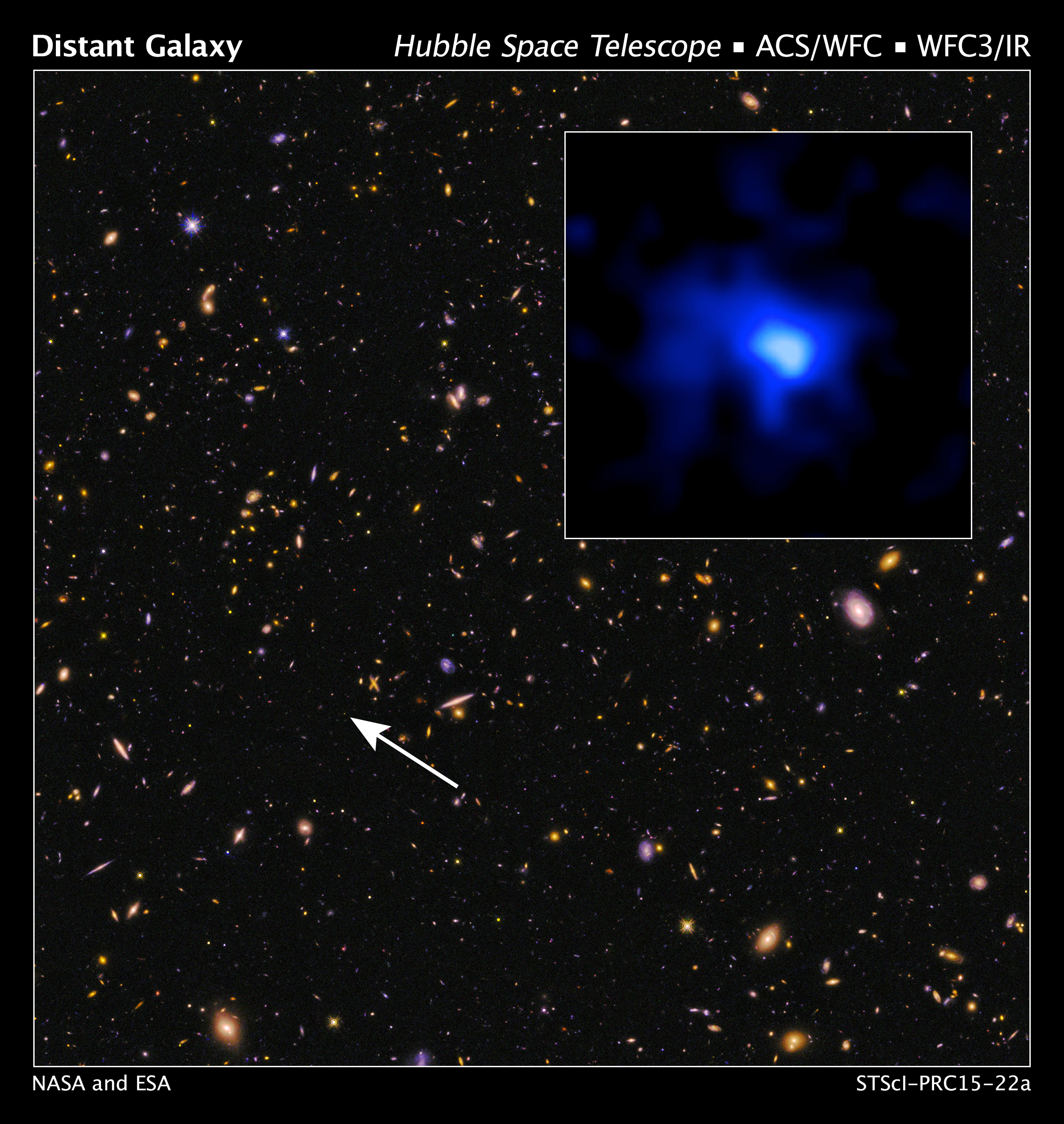
Hubble image of a field of galaxies with high redshift (z = 7.7).

The Cosmic Assembly Near-infrared Deep Extragalactic Legacy Survey (CANDELS) is the largest project in the history of the Hubble Space Telescope, with 902 assigned orbits (about 60 continuous days) of observing time. It was carried out between 2010 and 2013 with two cameras on board Hubble – WFC3 and ACS – and aims to explore galactic evolution in the early Universe, and the very first seeds of cosmic structure at less than one billion years after the Big Bang.

== Science goals ==
CANDELS is designed to document the first third of galactic evolution – on the redshifts from 8 to 1.5 – via deep imaging of more than 250,000 galaxies. Another goal is to find the first Type Ia supernova beyond z > 1.5 and establish their accuracy as standard candles for cosmology. Additional "daytime" WFC3/UV/Vis exposures in the GOODS-N field were conducted to take advantage of its continuous viewing zone opportunity.

== Facility and instruments ==
CANDELS' main instrument is the Wide Field Camera 3, a near-infrared camera installed on Hubble in May 2009. WFC3 works in tandem with the visible-light Advanced Camera for Surveys, which together gives unprecedented panchromatic coverage of galaxies from optical wavelengths to the near-infrared.
