= GNz7q =

Galaxy in the constellation Ursa Major

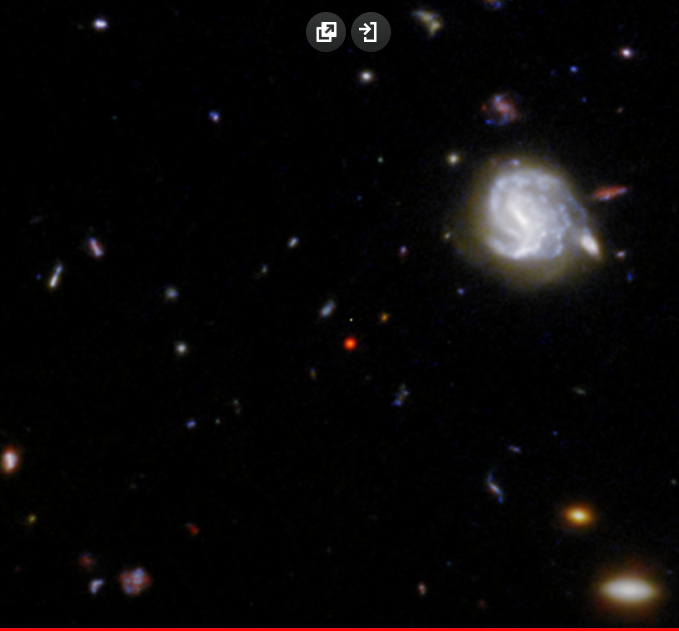
- Hubble Field containing GNz7q (the red dot in the center).

Observation data (J2000.0 epoch)
- Constellation: Ursa Major
- Right ascension: 12^{h} 36^{m} 16.9195^{s}
- Declination: 62° 12′ 32.127″
- Redshift: 7.1899 ± 0.0005
- Heliocentric radial velocity: 2,155,478 km/s
- Distance: 13 billion ly (4.0 billion pc) (light travel distance); 30 billion ly (9.2 billion pc) (present proper distance)

Other designations
- FBW2022 GNz7q

GNz7q is a starburst galaxy with a candidate proto-supermassive black hole in the early Universe, at a redshift of 7.1899 ± 0.0005, estimated to have existed only 750 million years after the Big Bang. It was discovered in the Great Observatories Origins Deep Survey-North (GOODS-North) field taken by the Hubble Space Telescope.

The discovery is "the first observation of a rapidly growing black hole in the early universe" and is thought to help explain the growth of supermassive black holes less than a billion years after the Big Bang.

== See also ==
- Direct collapse black hole, a process by which black holes may form less than a few hundred million years after the Big Bang
- J0313–1806, the earliest known supermassive black hole as of 2021, formed a few hundred million years after the Big Bang
