= Fabio Pacucci =

Italian theoretical astrophysicist and science educator

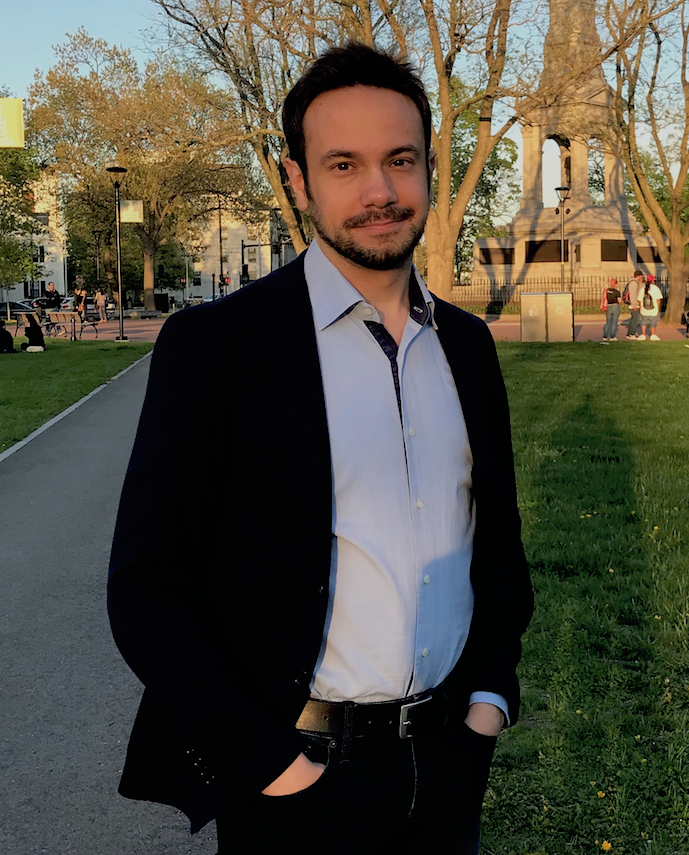
- Born: 1988 (age 37–38); Taranto, Italy
- Education: Scuola Normale Superiore (Italy)
- Awards: "Anello di San Cataldo" civic Prize (2025); Clay Fellowship (2019); International Astronomical Union Ph.D. Prize (2017); Livio Gratton Prize (2017); Enrico Persico Prize (2012)
- Scientific career
- Fields: Astrophysics, astronomy: Black holes; Quasars; High-redshift galaxies; Dark matter; Structure formation
- Workplaces: Harvard University; Smithsonian Astrophysical Observatory; Kapteyn Astronomical Institute; Yale University; Scuola Normale Superiore
- Website: www.fabiopacucci.com

Fabio Pacucci (born 1988) is an Italian-American astrophysicist and science communicator. He is currently a Staff Astrophysicist at the Center for Astrophysics | Harvard & Smithsonian, a collaboration between Harvard University and the Smithsonian Astrophysical Observatory.

He is widely known for his research on black holes, quasars, high-redshift galaxies, and dark matter, with a particular emphasis on the formation and evolution of the first black holes in the Universe, also known as black hole seeds. Pacucci led the discovery of the first candidate direct collapse black holes and contributed to identifying the farthest gravitationally-lensed quasar and galaxy known prior to the launch of the James Webb Space Telescope. More recently, he has been a leading contributor to the study of "Little Red Dots", a population of compact, high-redshift sources potentially hosting overmassive black holes. In this field, he led the first study that identified the Little Red Dots with accreting direct collapse black holes.

Pacucci is also active in science communication. He has collaborated with TED-Ed since 2018, creating a series of animated educational videos viewed by millions and translated into over 25 languages. In addition to numerous public talks, he has written for media outlets such as Scientific American, Sky & Telescope, and The Conversation.

== Early life and education ==
Pacucci was born in 1988 in Taranto, in the Apulia region of southern Italy. He attended the "Battaglini" Scientific High School and later enrolled at the Sapienza University of Rome, where he earned both his Bachelor of Science degree in Physics and his Master of Science degree in Astronomy and Astrophysics, graduating cum laude. He completed his Ph.D. in Physics in 2016 at the Scuola Normale Superiore in Pisa, Italy, under the supervision of Professor Andrea Ferrara. His dissertation, titled The First Black Holes in the Cosmic Dark Ages, focused on the theoretical modeling of early black hole formation.

== Career ==
After completing his Ph.D. in 2016, Pacucci joined Yale University as a Postdoctoral Research Associate in the Department of Physics. In 2019, he became a NOVA Fellow at the Kapteyn Astronomical Institute in the Netherlands, followed by a joint Clay Fellowship and Black Hole Initiative Fellowship at the Center for Astrophysics | Harvard & Smithsonian.

In 2025, Pacucci was appointed Staff Astrophysicist at the CfA and became a Senior Member of the Institute for Theory and Computation at Harvard University.

Pacucci is also active in the international astronomical community. He serves as co-chair of NASA’s X-ray Science Interest Group within NASA's Physics of the Cosmos Program. He is also a member of the steering committee for the Active Galactic Nuclei Working Group of NASA's Habitable Worlds Observatory and is part of the science team for the AXIS X-ray mission concept.

== Research contributions ==
=== Black hole formation and the early universe ===
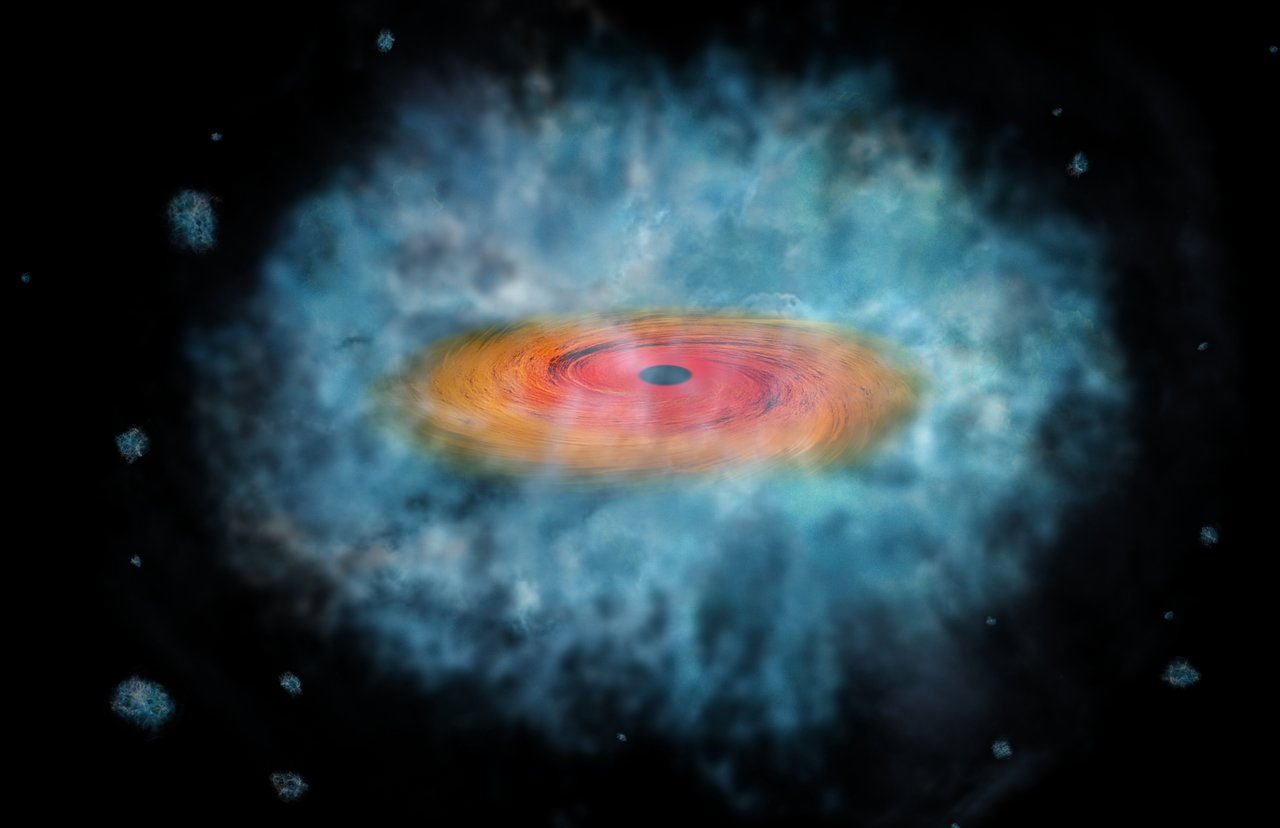
Artist's impression of the formation of a massive black hole seed via the direct black hole channel.

Pacucci contributed to the study of black hole formation in the early Universe. His primary research focuses on the first population of black holes, known as black hole seeds, and their observational signatures. In 2015, he developed GEMS (Growth of Early Massive Seeds), the first computational tool to predict the observational properties of these early black holes. Using this model, Pacucci led the discovery of the first two candidate direct collapse black holes, collapsed objects thought to have formed without passing through a stellar phase, based on multi-wavelength observations from the Hubble Space Telescope, Chandra X-ray Observatory, and Spitzer Space Telescope.

=== High-redshift quasars and gravitational lensing ===
In 2019, Pacucci contributed to the discovery of the first strongly lensed quasar at the epoch of reionization, known at the time as the brightest quasar in the early Universe, led by Xiaohui Fan. He analyzed the theoretical implications of this discovery in collaboration with Avi Loeb, suggesting that a significant population of similar objects may have been missed by existing surveys.

=== Little red dots ===
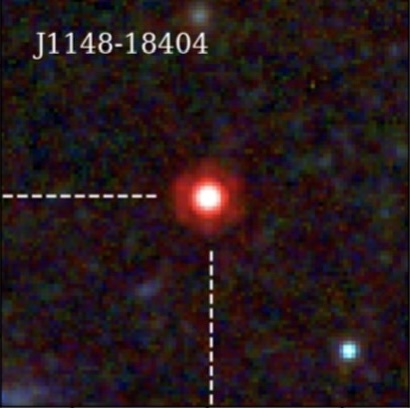
Example of a Little Red Dot.

With the launch of the James Webb Space Telescope, Pacucci led several studies on "Little Red Dots" a population of compact, red, high-redshift galaxies thought to host overmassive black holes. His study with Ramesh Narayan found that the black holes in these systems may accrete just above the Eddington limit, which could explain their X-ray faintness despite intense accretion activity. He also proposed, in a study with Avi Loeb, that the properties of little red dots may be explained by their origin in low-spin dark matter halos, linking their morphology to cosmological structure formation models. More recently, he authored the first study that identified the population of little red dots with accreting direct collapse black holes, using a suite of radiation-hydrodynamic simulations. In particular, the study shows that all their observational properties can be explained by mildly super-Eddington accretion onto a direct collapse black hole weighing 1 to 10 million solar masses.

=== Broader research areas ===
Beyond early black holes, Pacucci has also contributed to studies of dark matter, intermediate-mass black holes, and planetary dynamics. He has co-authored more than 200 scientific publications and has directly supervised tens of students, both graduate and undergraduate.

== Awards and honors ==
Pacucci has received several prizes for his work on black holes, including:

- 2025: Anello di San Cataldo civic prize awarded by the City of Taranto for outstanding contributions to science and its public dissemination
- 2019: Clay Fellowship at the Smithsonian Astrophysical Observatory
- 2017: IAU Ph.D. Prize – International Astronomical Union prize for his Ph.D. Thesis
- 2017: Livio Gratton Prize – Prize for the best Ph.D. thesis in astronomy in Italy (period 2014-2016)
- 2012: Enrico Persico Prize – from the Accademia Nazionale dei Lincei

== Science education ==
Pacucci is engaged in science outreach and education, with a particular focus on making complex astrophysical concepts accessible to the public. His efforts span writing, public lectures, and media collaboration.

Since 2018, he has collaborated with TED-Ed to create twelve educational videos on topics such as black holes, Hawking radiation, and the three-body problem. These animations have been viewed by millions of people worldwide and translated into over 25 languages, as noted in a feature by the Harvard Gazette.

He regularly writes about astrophysics for popular outlets, including Scientific American, Sky & Telescope, and The Conversation. His articles explore topics ranging from JWST discoveries to the philosophical dimensions of astrophysics. He has advised cultural projects like "The Black Hole Symphony" at the Boston Museum of Science. Pacucci has also delivered over 100 public outreach talks internationally.

== Selected publications ==
- Pacucci et al. (2014), The X-ray Spectra of the First Galaxies: 21 cm Signatures, MNRAS, Volume 443, Issue 1, p.678-686.
- Pacucci et al. (2016), First Identification of Direct Collapse Black Hole Candidates in the Early Universe in CANDELS/GOODS-S, MNRAS, Volume 459, Issue 2, p. 1432-1439.
- Pacucci et al. (2023), JWST CEERS and JADES Active Galaxies at z = 4-7 Violate the Local M_BH-M_star Relation at >3sigma: Implications for Low-mass Black Holes and Seeding Models, ApJ Letters, Volume 957, Issue 1, id.L3, 10 pp.
- Pacucci & Loeb (2024), The Redshift Evolution of the M_BH–M_star Relation for JWST's Supermassive Black Holes at z > 4, ApJ, Volume 964, Issue 2, id.154, 7 pp.
- Pacucci & Narayan (2024), Mildly Super-Eddington Accretion onto Slowly Spinning Black Holes Explains the X-Ray Weakness of the Little Red Dots, ApJ, Volume 976, Issue 1, id.96, 14 pp.
- Pacucci, Ferrara & Kocevski, The Little Red Dots Are Direct Collapse Black Holes, submitted.
