= J1144−4308 =

Quasar

SMSS J114447.77−430859.3
- Approximate location of SMSS J114447.77−430859.3 in the sky (circled)

Observation data (Epoch J2000)
- Constellation: Centaurus
- Right ascension: 11^{h} 44^{m} 47.76096^{s}
- Declination: −43° 08′ 59.4276″
- Redshift: 0.83

Other designations
- 2MASS J11444776−4308594

SMSS J114447.77−430859.3 or J1144 or J1144−4308 is a very bright (unbeamed) quasar (g = 14.5 ABmag, K = 11.9 Vegamag) and a supermassive black hole, that appears from Earth to be in the constellation Centaurus at RA 11h44m and Declination –43, near the Southern Cross (Crux). The SkyMapper Southern Survey (SMSS) was used to ascertain its spectral properties.

J1144 was identified during a search for binary stars. Despite being relatively bright, it had escaped classification as a quasar in earlier searches, which avoided the crowded fields near the galactic equator.

After examining various data sets, the study group determined that J1144 is the most intrinsically luminous quasar known over the last ~9 Gyr of cosmic history, having a luminosity 8 times greater than 3C 273 in Virgo.

According to the lead researcher Dr Christofer Onken, of the Australian National University: While black holes are themselves not visible; their gravity is so great that not even light can escape them, they are observable because of the matter that swirls around them.
