= Great Observatories Origins Deep Survey =

Astronomical survey that combines observations from 3 great NASA observatories

- Alternative names: GOODS
- Website: www.stsci.edu/science/goods/
- Related media on Commons

The Great Observatories Origins Deep Survey, or GOODS, is an astronomical survey combining deep observations from three of NASA's Great Observatories: the Hubble Space Telescope, the Spitzer Space Telescope, and the Chandra X-ray Observatory, along with data from other space-based telescopes, such as XMM Newton, and some of the world's most powerful ground-based telescopes.

GOODS is intended to enable astronomers to study the formation and evolution of galaxies in the distant, early universe.

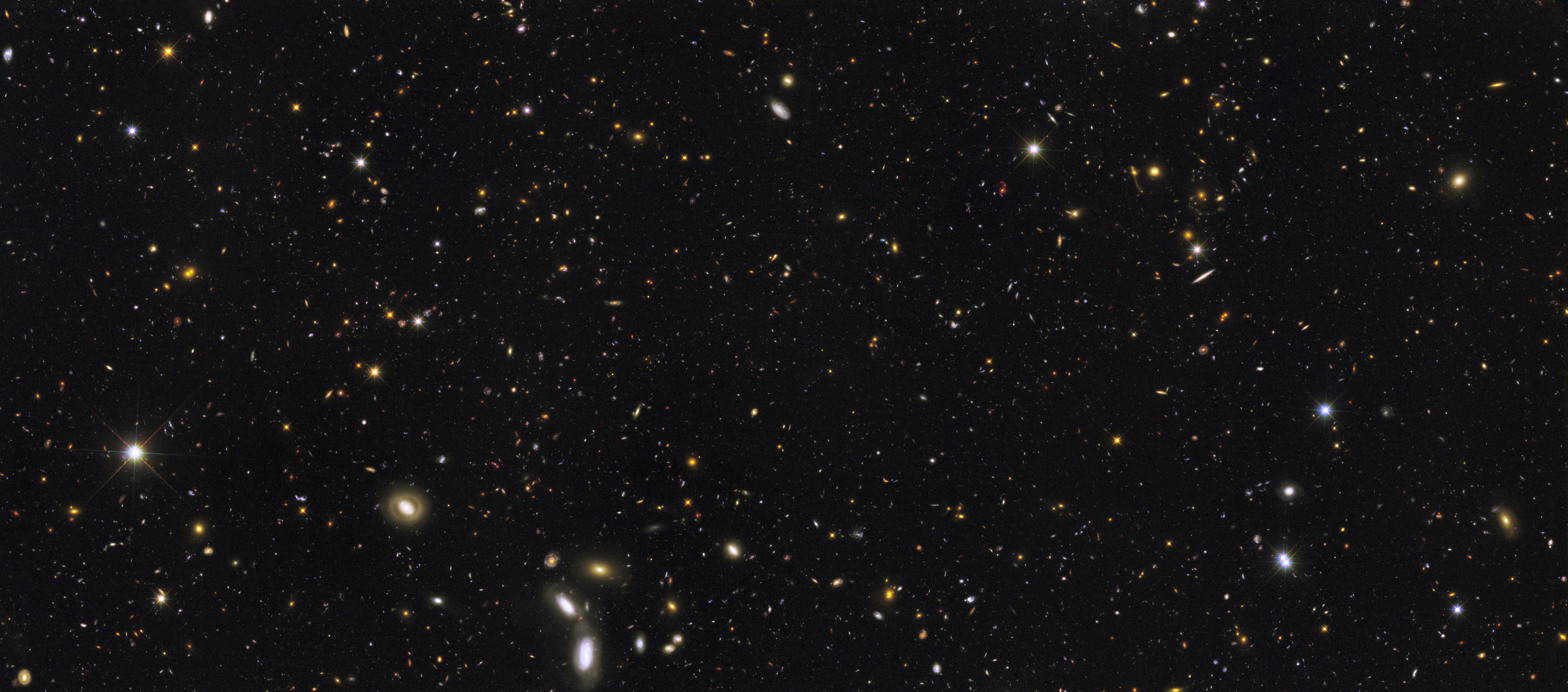
GOODS Field (Hubble Space Telescope component)

The Great Observatories Origins Deep Survey consists of optical and near-infrared imaging taken with the Advanced Camera for Surveys on the Hubble Space Telescope, the Very Large Telescope and the 4-m telescope at Kitt Peak National Observatory; infrared data from the Spitzer Space Telescope. These are added to pre-existing x-ray data from the Chandra X-ray Observatory and ESAs XMM-Newton, two fields of 10' by 16'; one centered on the Hubble Deep Field North (12h 36m 55s, +62° 14m 15s) and the other on the Chandra Deep Field South (3h 32m 30s, −27° 48m 20s).

The two GOODS fields are the most data-rich areas of the sky in terms of depth and wavelength coverage.

== Instruments ==
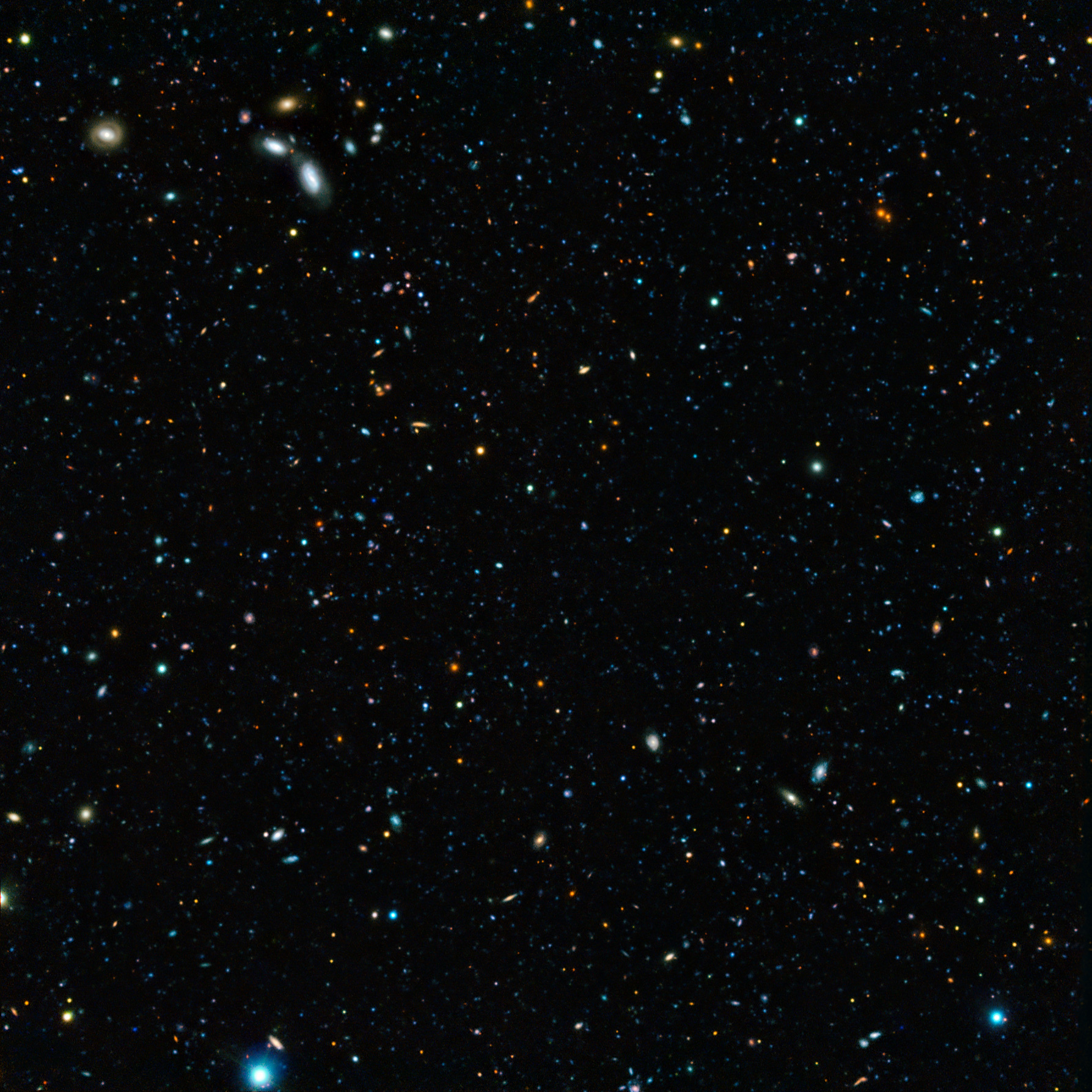
Composite image of the GOODS-South field, result of a deep survey using two of the four giant 8.2-metre telescopes composing ESO's Very Large Telescope

GOODS consists of data from the following space-based observatories:

- The Hubble Space Telescope (optical imaging with the Advanced Camera for Surveys)
- The Spitzer Space Telescope (infrared imaging)
- The Chandra X-ray Observatory (X-ray)
- XMM-Newton (an X-ray telescope belonging to the European Space Agency)
- The Herschel Space Observatory (an infrared telescope belonging to the ESA)

== Hubble Space Telescope images ==
GOODs used the Hubble Space Telescope's Advanced Camera for Surveys with four filters, centered at 435, 606, 775 and 850 nm. The resulting map covers 30 times the area of the Hubble Deep Field to a photometric magnitude less sensitivity, and has enough resolution to allow the study of 1 kpc-scale objects at redshifts up to 6. It also provides photometric redshifts for over 60,000 galaxies within the field, providing an excellent sample for studying bright galaxies at high redshifts.

== Herschel ==
In May 2010, scientists announced that the infrared data from the Herschel Space Observatory was joining the GOODS dataset, after initial analysis of data using Herschel's PACS and SPIRE instruments. In October 2009, Herschel observed the GOODS-North field, and in January 2010 the GOODS-South field. In so doing, Herschel identified sources for the Cosmic Infrared Background.

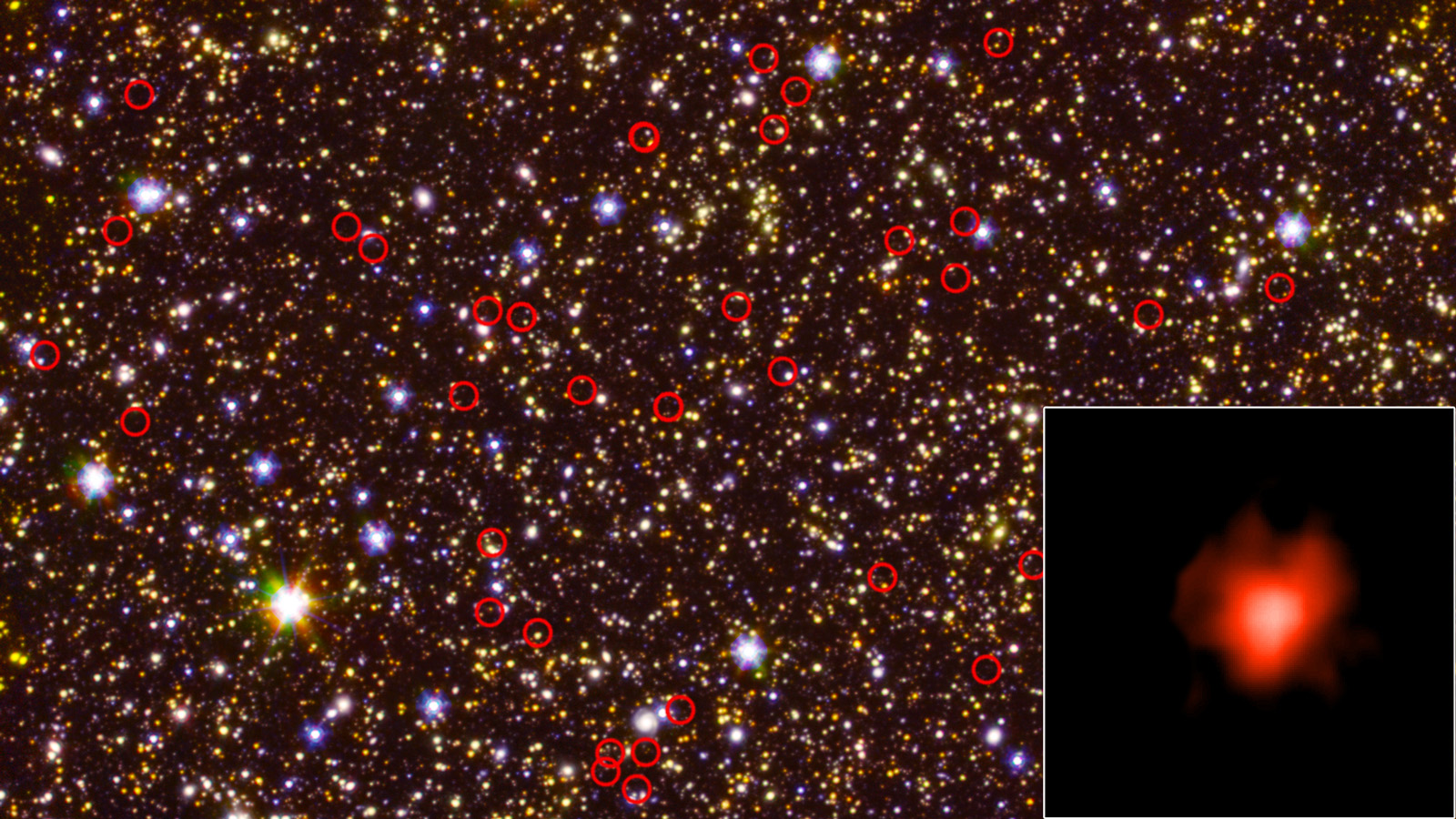
GREATS survey (GOODS Re-ionization Era wide-Area Treasury from Spitzer) Field Of Galaxies – Hubble and Spitzer Space Telescopes (red circles = very faint, distant galaxies; inset = one example) (8 May 2019)

== Findings ==
=== Direct collapse black holes ===
Two objects studied in the GOODS survey, GOODS-S 29323 and GOODS-S 33160, show evidence of being seeds for direct collapse black holes, a potential mechanism for the formation of black holes in the early universe involving the cloud of gas directly collapsing into a black hole. GOODS-S 29323 has a redshift of 9.73 (13.2 billion light years away from Earth), and GOODS-S 33160 has a redshift of 6.06. This distance portrays interest into the early universe, where matter was in large, dense, quantities. This distance leads to a possible conclusion that due to matter particles exerting gravity on themselves, they would instantly collapse, forming the earliest supermassive black holes that we know of in the center of many galaxies. High infrared radiation in the spectrum of these two objects would imply extremely high star-formation rates, but fits the model of a direct-collapse black hole. Additionally, X-ray radiation is present in these objects, thought to be originating from the hot accretion disk of a collapsing black hole.

GOODS-S 29323 is located in the constellation Fornax, at right ascension 03h 32m 28s and declination –27° 48′ 30″.

== Gallery ==
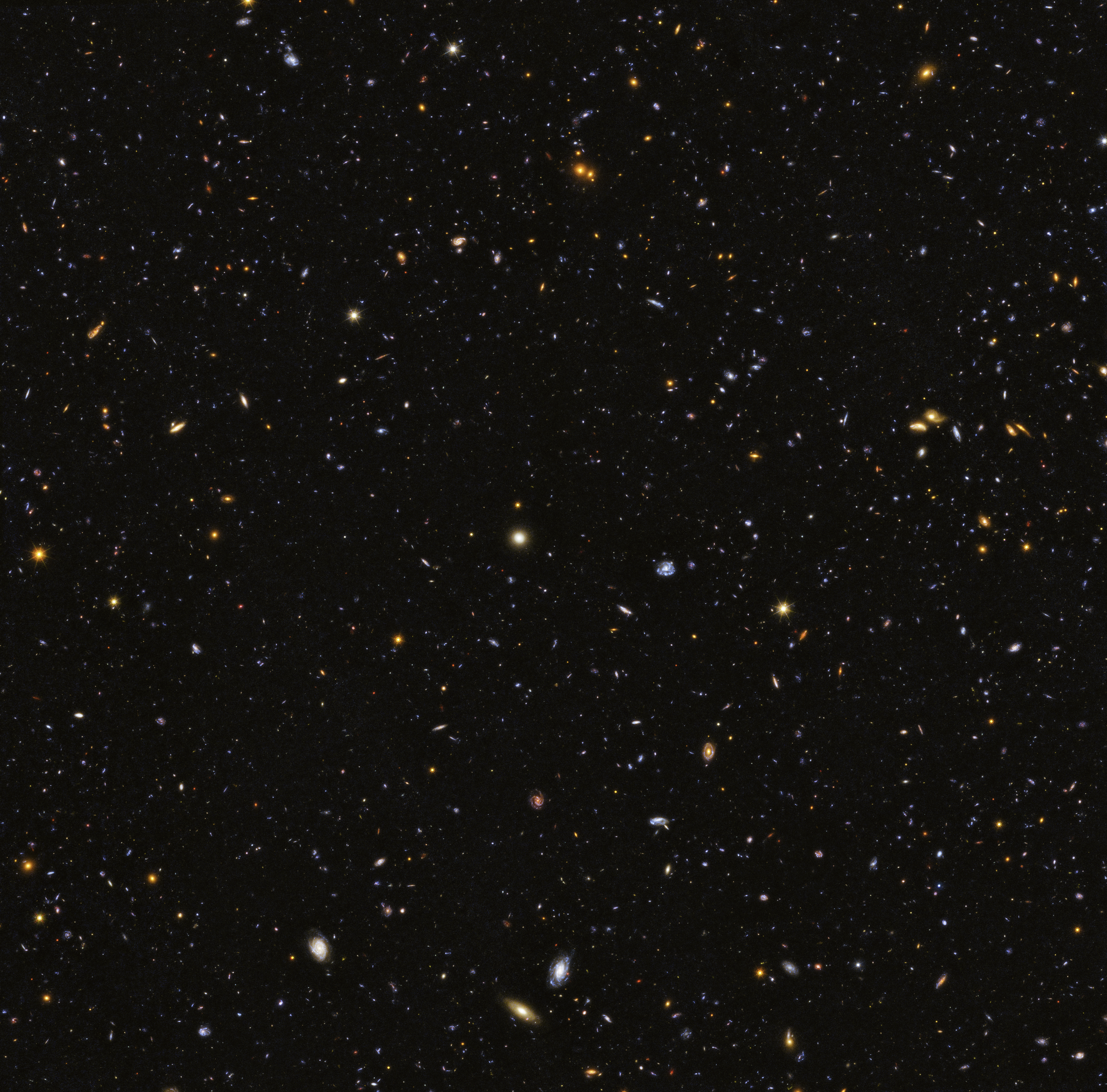
Hubble Deep UV (HDUV) Legacy Field, the GOODS-South view

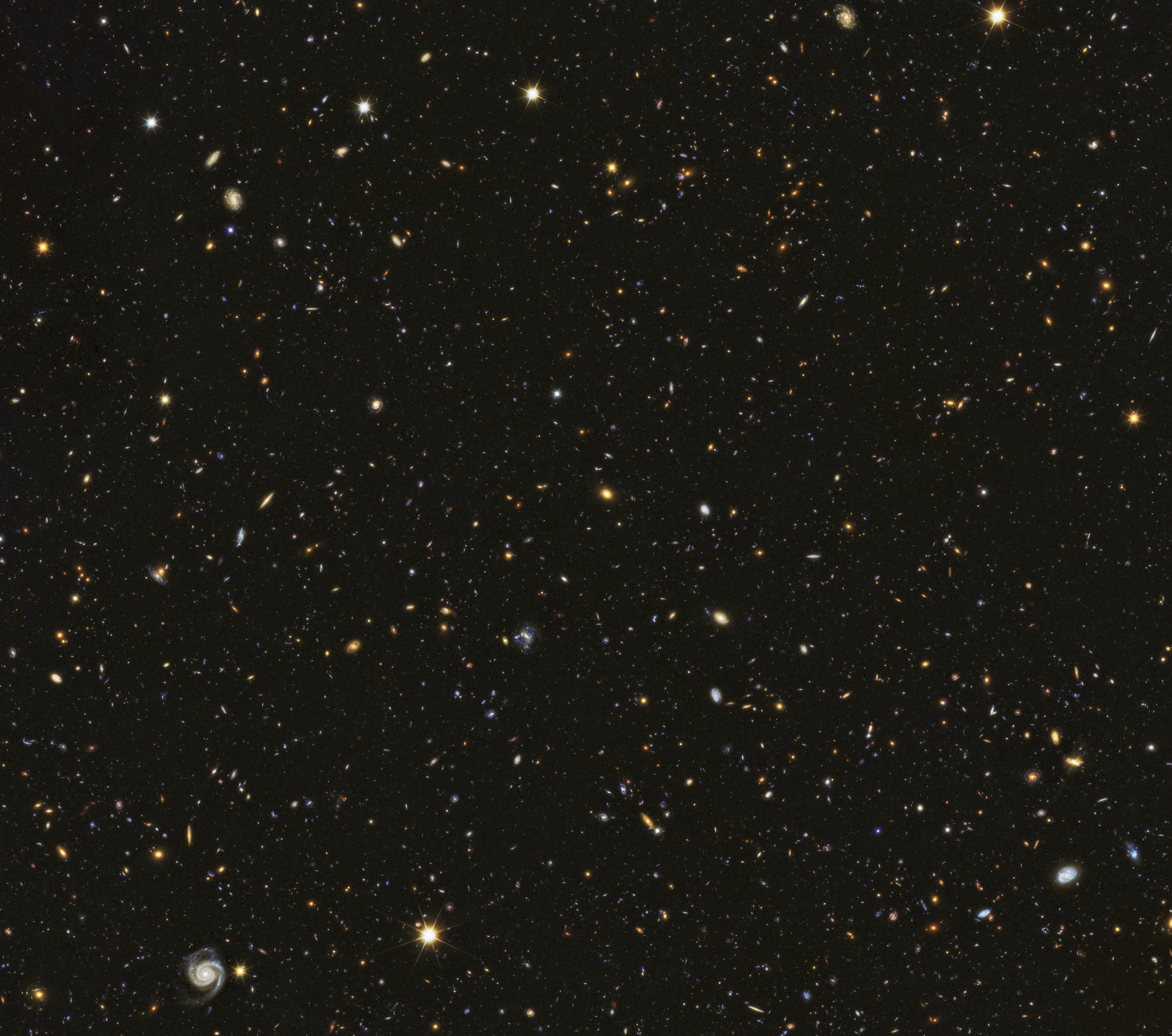
GOODS North field taken by Hubble

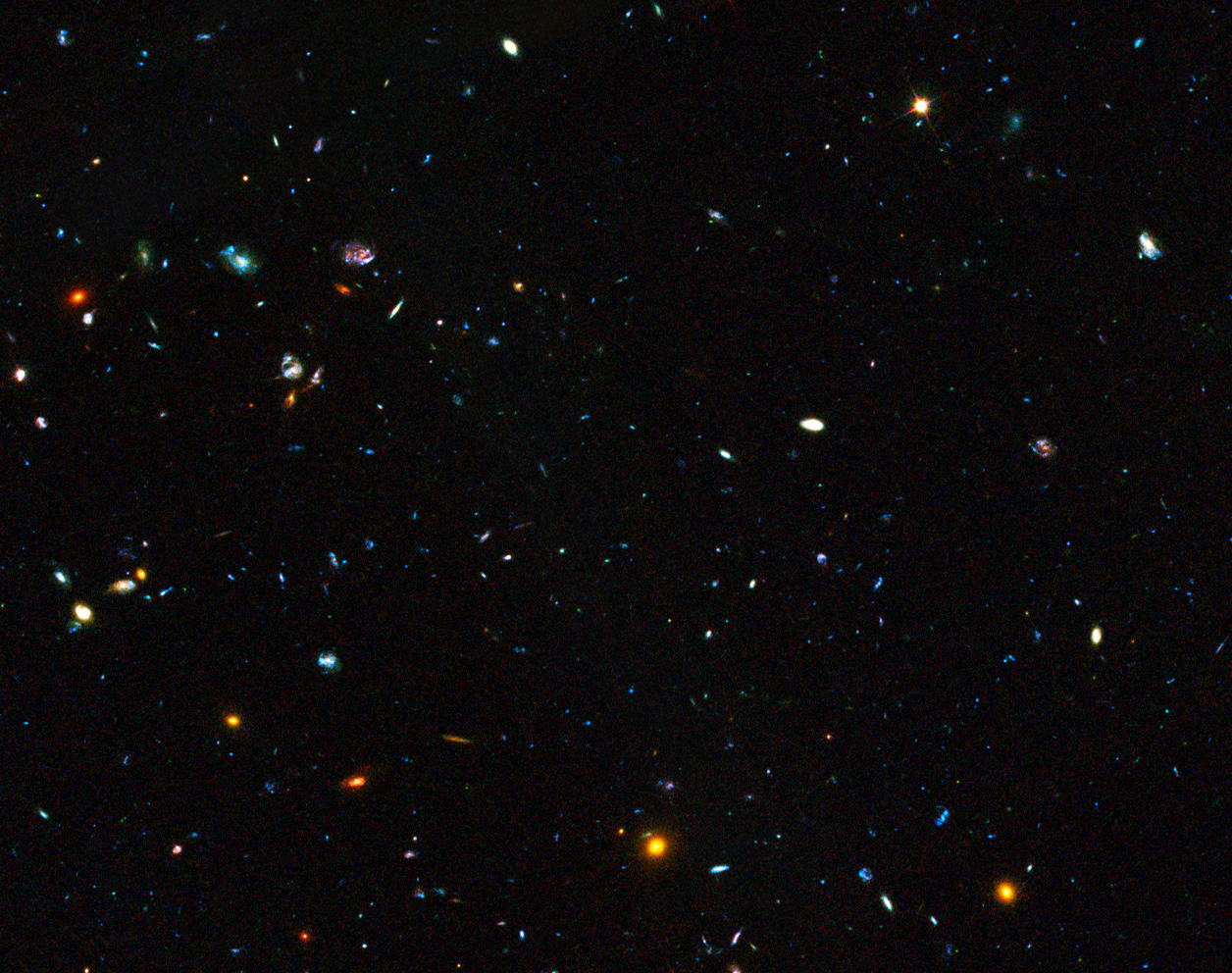
GOODS field containing distant dwarf galaxies

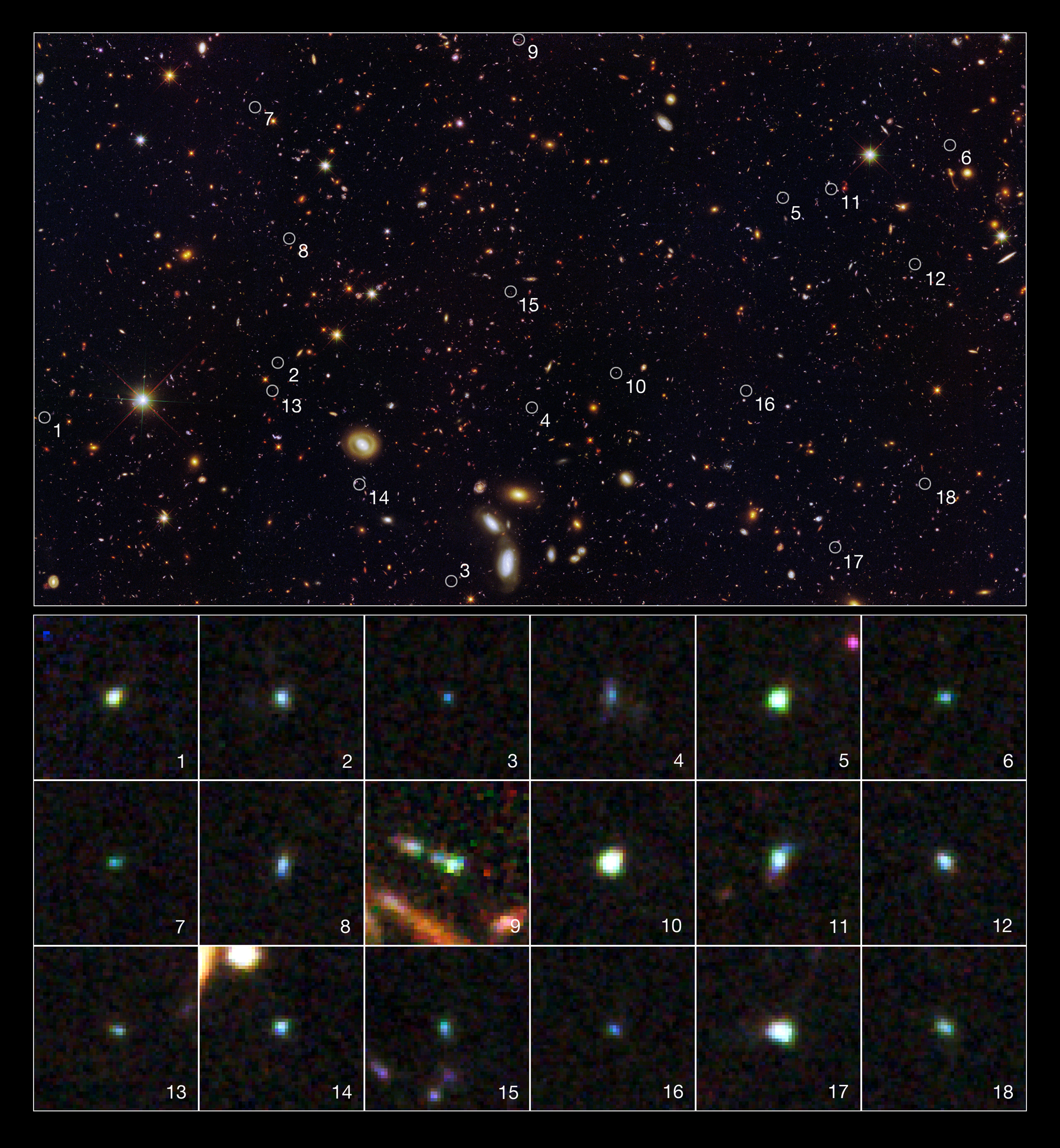
GOODS South Field

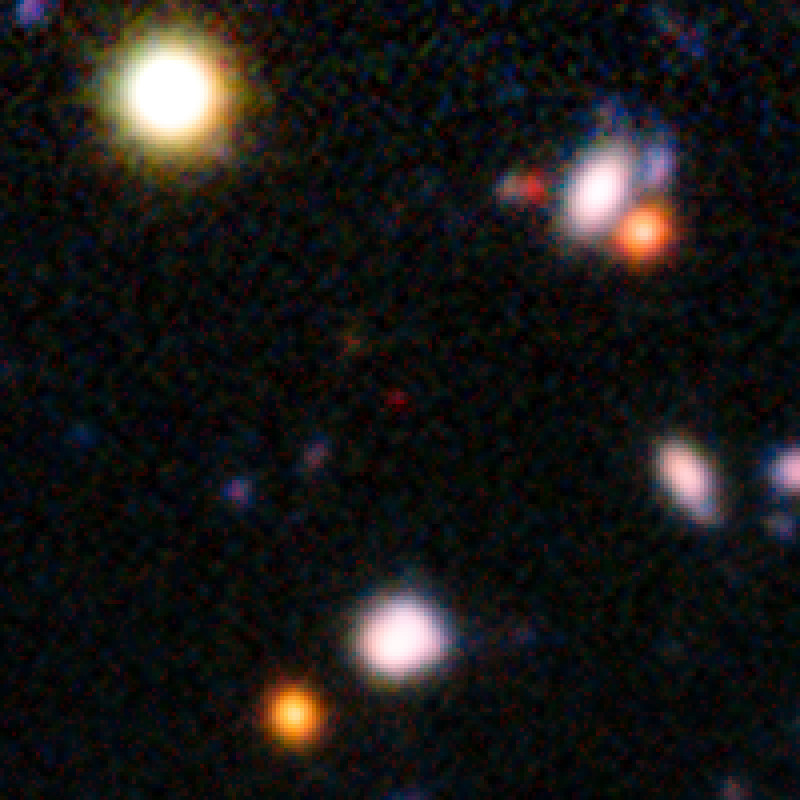
Galaxy NTTDF-474 is one of five that have been used to chart the timeline of the reionisation of the Universe. Image taken by ESO's Very Large Telescope.

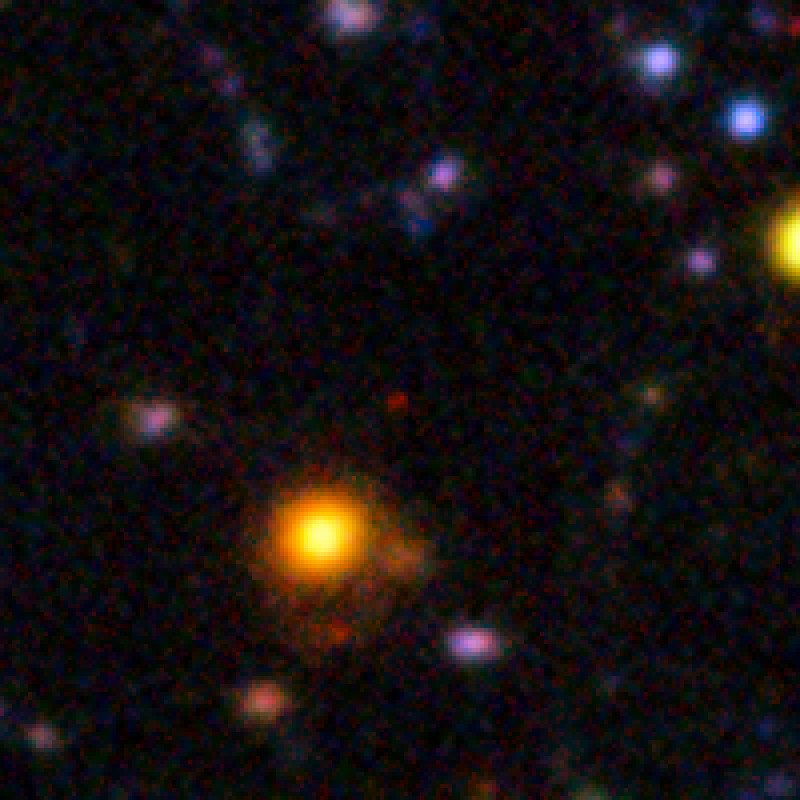
Galaxy NTTDF-6345 is one of five that have been used to chart the timeline of the reionisation of the Universe. Image taken by ESO's Very Large Telescope.

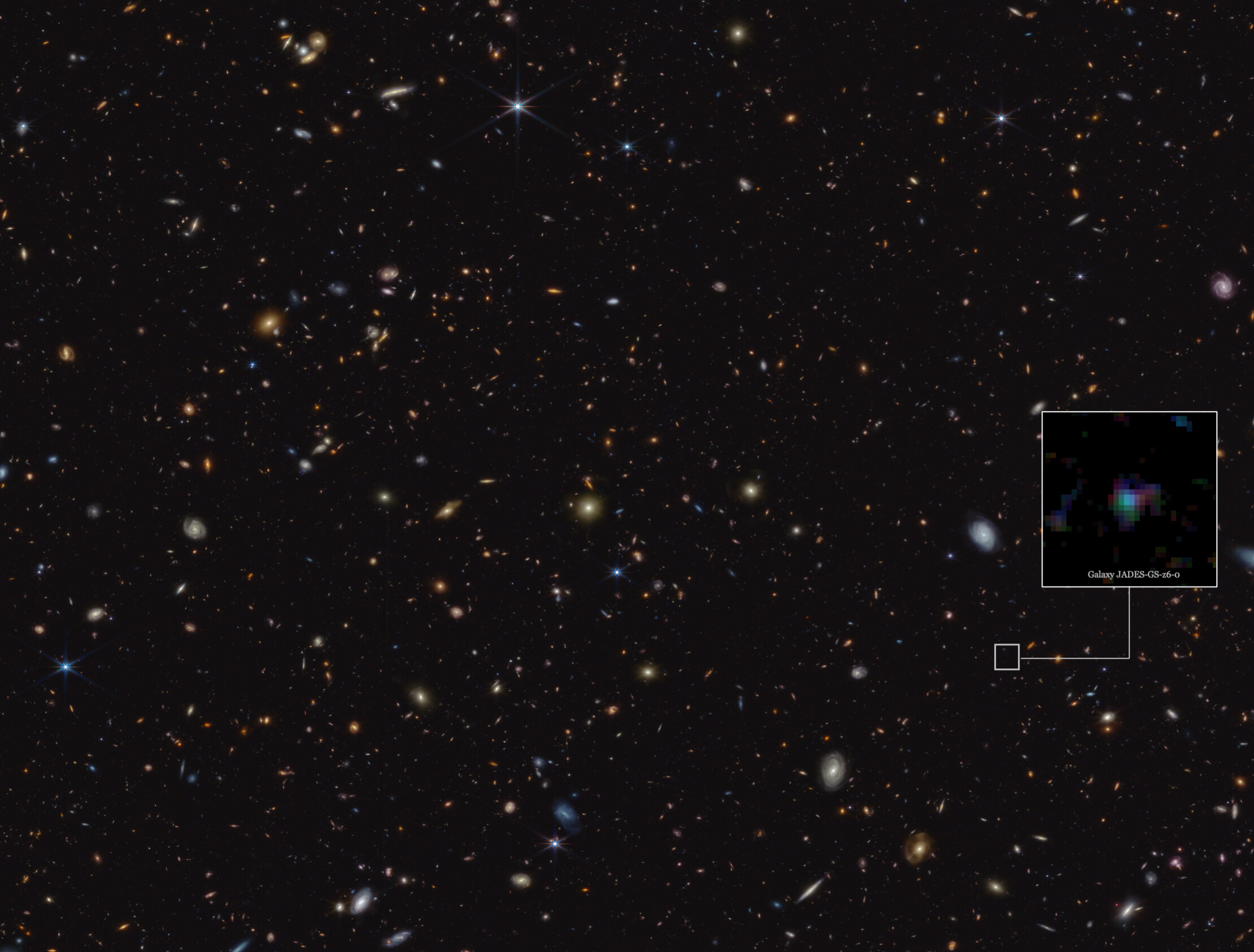
Galaxy JADES-GS-z6 in the GOODS-S field: JADES (NIRCam image) – James Webb Space Telescope

GOODS-S field (NIRCam image), James Webb Space Telescope is already providing new insights into this question
